= Bothwell (disambiguation) =

Bothwell is a town in Scotland.

Bothwell may also refer to:

== Places ==
- Bothwell Castle, Scotland
- Bothwell (UK Parliament constituency), Scotland
- Bothwell, Tasmania, in Australia
- Bothwell, Ontario, Canada
- Bothwell, Prince Edward Island, Canada, an unincorporated area of Kings County, Prince Edward Island east of Souris, Prince Edward Island
  - Bothwell (Canadian electoral district), a historical electoral district centred on the community
- Bothwell, Utah, an unincorporated farming community in Box Elder County, Utah.
- Bothwell Lodge State Historic Site located just north of Sedalia, Missouri, United States
- New Bothwell, Manitoba, a community in southeastern Manitoba, Canada

== People ==
- Earl of Bothwell
  - Patrick Hepburn, 1st Earl of Bothwell (d. 1508) was Lord High Admiral of Scotland.
  - Adam Hepburn, 2nd Earl of Bothwell, (d.1513) was a Scottish nobleman, who succeeded his father in 1508. Prior to that, he was known by one of his territorial designations, Adam Hepburn of Crags, under which he drew up his Testament.
  - Patrick Hepburn, 3rd Earl of Bothwell (1512–1556), son of Adam Hepburn, Lord Hailes, who died at the Battle of Flodden the year after Patrick's birth.
  - James Hepburn, 4th Earl of Bothwell (c. 1534–1578), the third husband of Mary, Queen of Scots
  - Francis Stewart Hepburn, 1st Earl of Bothwell (c. 1562–1612), was Commendator of Kelso Abbey and Coldingham Priory, a Privy Counsellor and Lord High Admiral of Scotland.
- Lord Bothwell, John Ramsay, 1st Lord Bothwell (c.1464-1513), later Sir John Ramsay of Trarinzeane, Scottish knight who spied for England

== Other uses ==
- Bothwell (surname)
- Bothwell Cheese, an award-winning cheese manufacturer based in New Bothwell, Manitoba, Canada.
