= Crichton Castle =

Ruin in Midlothian, Scotland

- Crichton, Midlothian, Scotland; UK grid reference NT380613
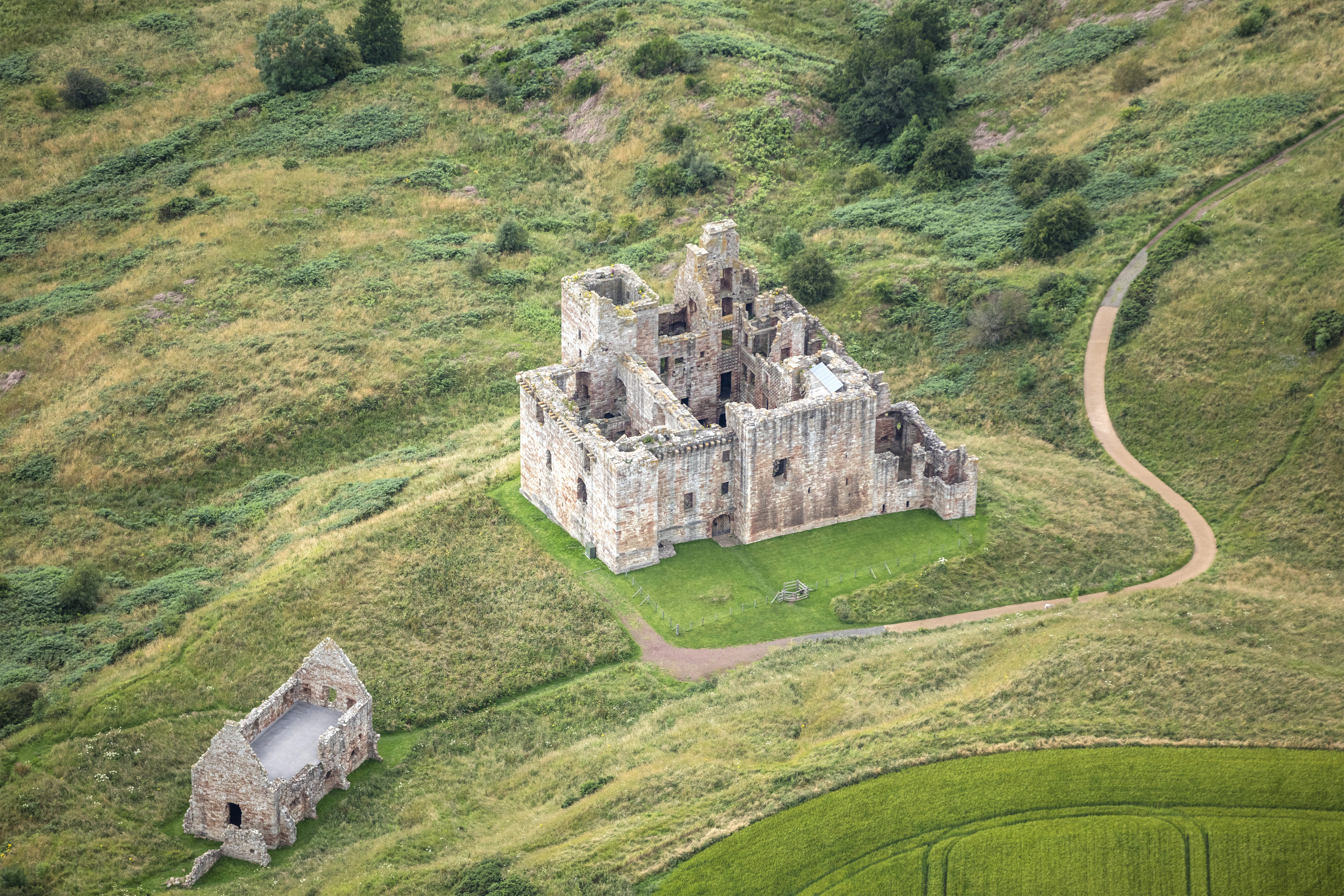
- Aerial view of Crichton Castle and stables

Site information
- Type: Tower house and courtyard
- Owner: Historic Environment Scotland
- Controlled by: Crichton family Earl of Bothwell
- Open to the public: Yes
- Condition: Ruined

Location
- Location within Midlothian council area
- Location within Midlothian
- Coordinates: 55°50′28″N 2°59′22″W

Site history
- Built: Late 14th century
- Built by: John de Crichton (d.1406)

Crichton Castle is a ruined castle near the village of Crichton in Midlothian, Scotland. It is situated at the head of the River Tyne, 2 miles (3.2 km) south of the village of Pathhead, and the same distance east of Gorebridge.

Constructed as a tower house in the late 14th century, it was expanded as the power of the Crichton family grew. However, the Crichtons fell from favour in the later 15th century, and the castle passed to the Earls of Bothwell. The 5th Earl of Bothwell constructed the Italianate north range in the 1580s, featuring an elaborate diamond-patterned facade. After Bothwell was accused of witchcraft the castle fell into neglect. The ruins are now in the care of Historic Environment Scotland, and are open to the public. A mile to the south-west is Borthwick Castle, a 15th-century tower house that is still in use.

== History ==
In the late 14th century, John de Crichton (d.1406) built a tower house here as his family residence. John's son, William (d. c. 1453), served as Lord Chancellor of Scotland, and was made Lord Crichton in c. 1443. In 1440, William had been partly responsible for organising the "Black Dinner", where the young William Douglas, 6th Earl of Douglas, was murdered. As a result, Crichton obtained the Douglas property of Bothwell Castle in Lanarkshire for himself. John of Corstorphine, chief of Clan Forrester and a Douglas adherent, stormed and slighted the castle in 1445 in retaliation. William, however, reconstructed and extended the castle, and also built the nearby collegiate church.

The 3rd Lord Crichton was a supporter of Alexander Stewart, Duke of Albany, and his lands and titles were forfeit in 1483, when Albany was sentenced for treason. Crichton Castle, along with Bothwell Castle, was briefly granted to Sir John Ramsey, who forfeited it in 1488. That year, James IV granted Crichton Castle to Patrick Hepburn, Lord Hailes, who was later made Earl of Bothwell. Hepburn's son Adam, the second Earl, died at the Battle of Flodden in 1513. The castle became the property of Adam's widow, Lady Agnes Stewart, who married Alexander Home, 3rd Lord Home in 1514. Lady Agnes's son Patrick Hepburn, 3rd Earl of Bothwell, inherited the castle and intrigued with the English against the Scottish crown, but eventually made peace with the regent, Mary of Guise.

James Hepburn, 4th Earl of Bothwell, sided with Mary of Guise during the Scottish Reformation, and when he took English money sent to the Lords of the Congregation, the Regent James Hamilton, Duke of Châtellerault ordered an assault on Borthwick and Crichton castles. Crichton was besieged and captured on 3 November 1559 by the Duke's son, Earl of Arran and Master of Maxwell . They ransacked Crichton and took away Bothwell's legal charters and evidences.

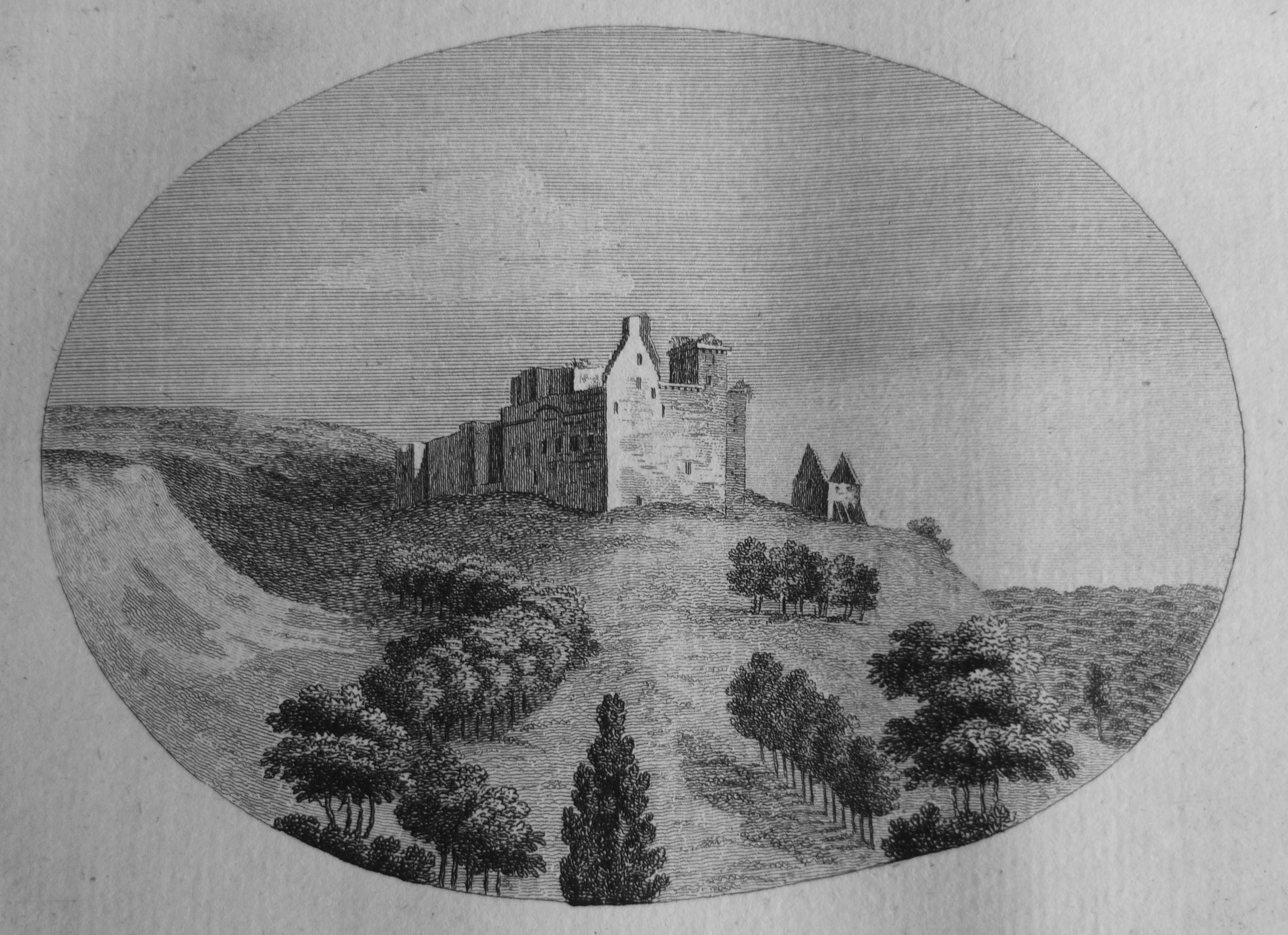
The castle ruins in the late 18th century

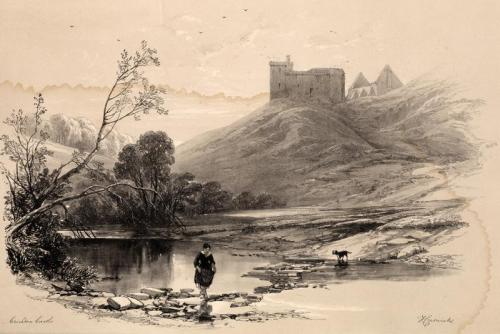
Crichton Castle - lithograph by James Duffield Harding

The castle was the scene of the marriage and wedding festivities, on 4 January 1562, of Patrick's daughter Jean (d. before July 1599) and John Stewart, who was Prior of Coldingham and illegitimate son of King James V. John Stewart's half-sister Mary, Queen of Scots, spent a few nights at the castle while attending this wedding. Witnesses for the divorce of the Earl of Bothwell and Jean Gordon said the Earl entertained Bessy Crawford in the mid-chamber of the kitchen tower. The Earl of Bothwell was implicated in February 1567 in the murder of Queen Mary's husband Henry Stuart, Lord Darnley, and became Mary's third husband in May of that year. In December, all Bothwell's titles and estates, including Crichton Castle, were forfeited.

In 1568, Crichton Castle, along with Bothwell's other estates, was granted to Francis Stewart, son of John Stewart and Jean Hepburn, and thus bastard grandson of James V. Francis was created Earl of Bothwell in 1577 and married Margaret Douglas. He travelled in Europe, and he designed the very modern Italianate north range in the 1580s. James VI was at Crichton on 17 March 1587, planning an embassy to Denmark with Peter Young. Bothwell lost the king's favour and was accused of witchcraft and forfeited his estates in 1592. He was eventually forced to flee to Naples where he died. His son Francis Stewart was reinstated, but laboured under his father's debts, and sold the castle to the Hepburns of Humbie.

James VI stayed at Crichton Castle on 19 June 1598, his birthday, after a day's hawking.

J. M. W. Turner painted the castle, and it features in Sir Walter Scott's Marmion. In 1956, the castle was given into state care by its owner, Major Henry Callander of Preston Hall. It is now in the care of Historic Environment Scotland, and has been a scheduled monument since 1921. Crichton was used as a location in the 1995 film Rob Roy and the 2011 film The Wicker Tree.

== Architecture ==
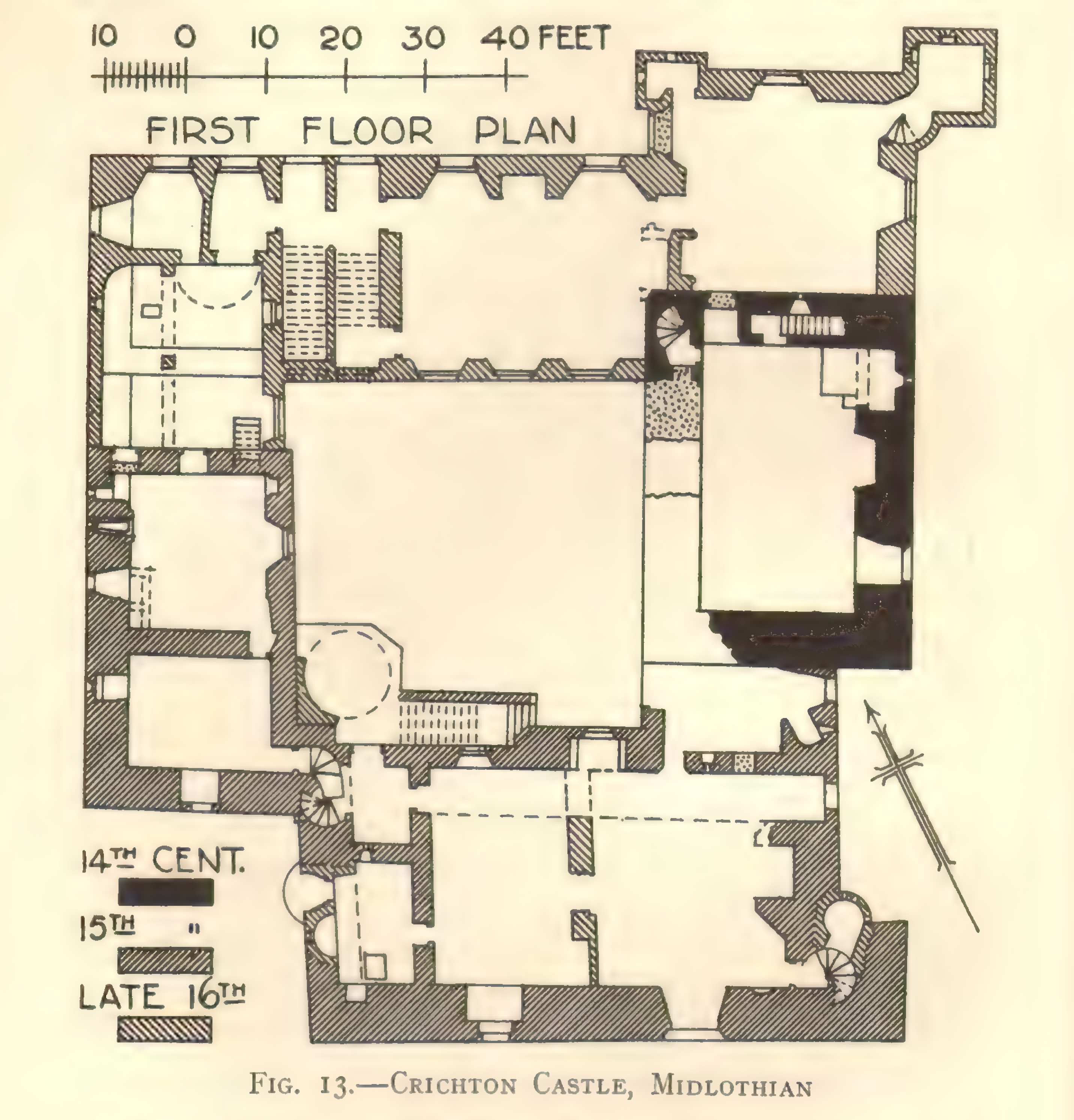
Plan of Crichton Castle

Crichton Castle comprises four contiguous buildings arranged around an inner courtyard. The 14th-century tower lies at the east of the castle, and has a vaulted basement with timber entresol, and a vaulted hall above, although the south-west corner of the tower has collapsed. To the west of this tower was a barmkin. William Crichton extended the castle in the early 15th century, building a second tower to the south, forming a strong L-plan, with the gate between the two towers. The south tower was entered by a door in the centre, with vaulted cellars either side. Two halls occupied the first and second floors. In the later 15th century a west block was added, with a six-storey tower at the south-west, containing several bedrooms with garderobes. A stair in the south block gave access to these rooms. The north range was added at this time, closing the courtyard, but this section was heavily rebuilt in the following century.

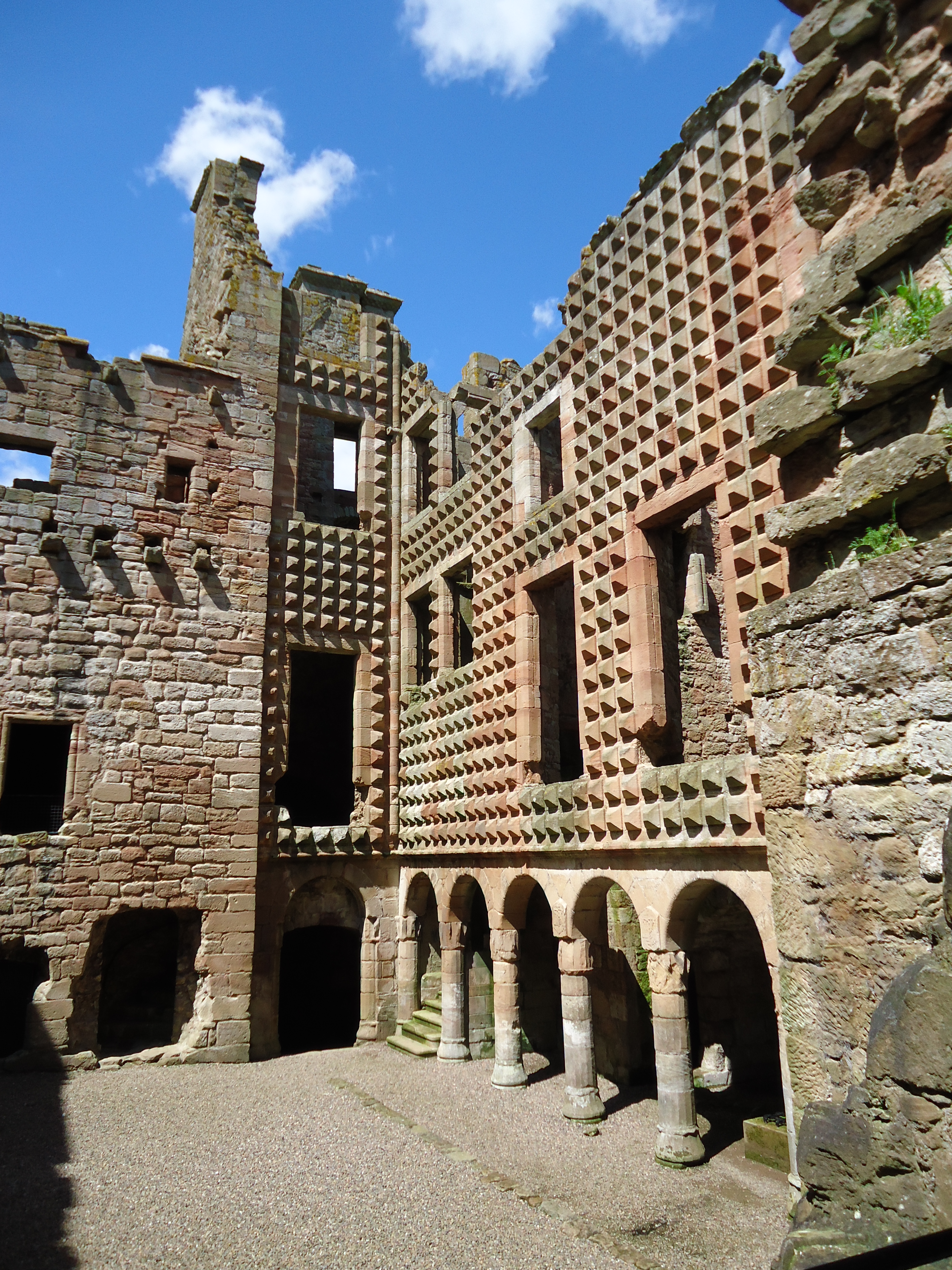
The north west corner of the courtyard, showing diamond-pattern facade.

The castle's most distinctive feature is its Italian-influenced courtyard façade, which forms part of the north range. Francis Stewart, the designer, had travelled to Italy, and was inspired by new styles and technology in buildings there, particularly the Palazzo dei Diamanti in Ferrara (c. 1582). This was the source of the diamond rustication on the courtyard wall. The initials of Francis and his wife Margaret Douglas appear on the walls, together with an anchor representing Stewart's position of Lord High Admiral of Scotland. Inside are further innovations: Scotland's first "scale-and-platt" stair, i.e. a modern-style staircase with landings; and a drawing room to the north of the old tower. To the south of the castle is a large stable block, with a horseshoe-shaped window and lodgings above.
