= Admiral Hepburn =

Admiral Hepburn may refer to:

- Adam Hepburn, 2nd Earl of Bothwell (c. 1492–1513), Lord High Admiral of Scotland
- Arthur Japy Hepburn (1877–1964), U.S. Navy admiral
- James Hepburn, 4th Earl of Bothwell (c. 1534–1578), Lord High Admiral of Scotland
- Patrick Hepburn, 1st Earl of Bothwell (died 1508), Lord High Admiral of Scotland
- Patrick Hepburn, 3rd Earl of Bothwell (1512–1556), Lord High Admiral of Scotland
