= James Home of Coldenknowes =

Scottish landowner, soldier and keeper of Edinburgh Castle

James Home of Coldenknowes (hjˈuːm; died 1592) was a Scottish landowner, soldier, and keeper of Edinburgh Castle.

== Biography ==
His father, John Home of Coldenknowes, died in 1573, his mother was Margaret Ker, a daughter of Andrew Ker of Castle. Before the death of his father, James Home was known as "James Home of Syndlaws" from an estate inherited from his mother near Roxburgh. His son sold Syndlaws to James Ker of Spynie in 1598.

Coldenknowes House survives much modified by the River Leader near Earlston in Berwickshire. James Home rebuilt the house from 1574, a lintel includes his parents' initials. His sister Isobel Home married the Laird of Corsbie and Margaret Home (died 1593), married William Turnbull of Bedrule.

Home was knighted at Stirling Castle on 25 May 1565 when Mary, Queen of Scots made Lord Darnley Earl of Ross. Regent Morton appointed Home as warden of the East March of the Scottish Borders in November 1573. They disagreed, and Morton replaced him in 1578.

In March 1584 Home and the Laird of Cessford were threatened with imprisonment and their acquittal was secured by Elizabeth Stewart, Countess of Arran the powerful wife of the royal favourite James Stewart, Earl of Arran. He was imprisoned in Blackness Castle and in June allowed to stay in Edinburgh, by the intercession of Francis Stewart, 5th Earl of Bothwell and the Secretary John Maitland.

A Danish account of the Entry and Coronation of Anne of Denmark in Edinburgh in May 1590 lists him with Scottish gentlemen riding with the queen as "Juncker Kaudenscraus".

Home was commended for his actions against the rebel Francis Stewart, 5th Earl of Bothwell in 1591, even though the Earl was a family connection, and had escaped from Edinburgh Castle with the help of Home's own servant Lowther while the king was away at a dance at Tullibardine. James VI allowed him continue as keeper of Edinburgh Castle.

== Marriage and family ==
He married Katherine Home. His children included:

- John Home of Coldenknowes, who married (1) Marie Sinclair, daughter of Jean Hepburn and John Sinclair, Master of Caithness, (2) in 1608 Beatrix Ruthven. His eldest son was James Home of Whitrig, lieutenant of the royal guard, who married Anna Home, a daughter of George Home, 1st Earl of Dunbar, and was the father of James Home, 3rd Earl of Home
- James Home of Eccles, who married Isobel Home
- Harry or Henry Home, who married Margaret Sinclair. In May 1594 he sold Bedrule Castle and its lands back to Walter and William Turnbull, the hereditary owners.
- John Home, whose mother's name is unknown

In February 1584, it was said that Home wished to marry, as a second wife, a daughter of the Laird of Cessford, but James VI suggested he should marry Marie Stewart, a daughter of his favourite Esmé Stewart, 1st Duke of Lennox. She was then around 7 years old.
