= Lady Agnes Stewart =

Scottish noble (1480–1557)

Lady Agnes Stewart (1480–1557) was a Scottish noble, a cousin of King James IV of Scotland. She was born the illegitimate daughter of James Stewart, 1st Earl of Buchan and Margaret Murray. On 31 October 1552, she was legitimized under the Great Seal of Scotland.

== Marriages ==
Lady Agnes Stewart married first Adam Hepburn, 2nd Earl of Bothwell in August 1511 (killed at the Battle of Flodden on 9 September 1513), secondly Alexander Home, 3rd Lord Home (executed on 8 October 1516), thirdly Robert Maxwell, 5th Lord Maxwell (died 9 July 1546), and fourthly Cuthbert Ramsay, who survived her. She died in February, 1557.

Agnes Stewart was known as Lady Bothwell, or the Countess of Bothwell after her first marriage; as Lady Home during her second marriage; as Lady Maxwell during her third marriage. During her marriage to Cuthbert Ramsay she used one of her previous titles. Women in early modern Scotland did not use their husband's surnames after marriage.

In December 1520, Margaret Tudor, the widow of James IV of Scotland who had married the Earl of Angus, granted Agnes Stewart the forest stead lands of Tinnis and the tower and place of Tynnis, with the adjacent forest stead of Deuchar.

== Cuthbert Ramsay ==
Her fourth husband Cuthbert Ramsay, was a merchant burgess of Edinburgh. He was a brother of George Ramsay, laird of Dalhousie, and Captain of Crichton Castle. In 1556 they signed a document at Crichton appointing a chaplain as predend at Dunglass Collegiate Church. In 1557, they obtained lands at Paxton from John Stewart, Commendator of Coldingham.

After Agnes Stewart's death, Ramsay married Janet Fleming, widow of William Craik. His stepchildren included Alison Craik, said to have been the mistress of James Hamilton, 3rd Earl of Arran. Cuthbert Ramsay was a supporter of William Kirkcaldy of Grange and the garrison of Edinburgh Castle during the Marian Civil War. He was put in charge of Edinburgh's customs in 1571. In 1575, he gave evidence for divorce proceedings for Mary, Queen of Scots, and James Hepburn, 4th Earl of Bothwell.

=== Captain Ramsay ===
At the same period, another Cuthbert Ramsay served as a soldier for the Regents of Scotland, Known as "Captain Ramsay", he was present at the siege of Dumbarton Castle and fought against William Kirkcaldy of Grange in Edinburgh. William Drury described him as a "trench master". The soldier Cuthbert Ramsay was killed fighting in Edinburgh in October 1571.

== Children ==
Children of Lady Agnes Stewart and Alexander Home, 3rd Lord Home include:

1. Janet Home, married John Hamilton of Samuelston (aka Clydesdale John), illegitimate son of James Hamilton, 1st Earl of Arran
