= John Stewart, Commendator of Coldingham =

Scottish landowner

Arms of John Stewart, Prior of Coldingham

John Stewart, Commendator of Coldingham (1531–1563) was a Scottish landowner.

He was a son of Elizabeth Carmichael (1514–1550) and James V of Scotland.

His mother later married John Somerville of Cambusnethan.

== Career ==
As a child, John Stewart was given the estates and incomes of Coldingham Priory, and was usually called the Prior or Commendator of Coldingham, or "Lord John". His father, James V, wrote to Cardinal Rodolfo Pio da Carpi, in July 1541 that John should be Prior of Coldingham in place of Adam Blackadder, who became Abbot of Dundrennan, and his son would be able to prevent Protestant doctrine spreading from the nearby border with England. In his letter, James V explained that the danger of the "new doctrines" spreading was great because of the "community of language", the Scots language being similar in some respects to English. At this time, John Stewart was around nine years old, as an adult, he sometimes resided at Coldingham.

In August 1548 Lord John Stewart and his half-brother Lord Robert sailed for France from Dumbarton with Mary, Queen of Scots. According to an English observer, Henry Johnes, their elder half brothers, Lord James Prior of St Andrews and James Stewart, Commendator of Kelso and Melrose refused to go.

=== Regency of Mary of Guise ===
In 1550, after the conclusion of the war known the Rough Wooing, he accompanied his step-mother Mary of Guise on a visit to the French court. Stewart was in Paris in February 1551 and wrote to Mary of Guise. His letter concerns a property in France, the Abbey of Flavigny en Auxois, a gift to him from Henry II of France. In July 1553, his sister Lady Jean Stewart was contracted to marry Archibald Campbell, 5th Earl of Argyll. Her cash dowry of 5,000 merks was to be paid by Mary of Guise and her brothers, the Commendators of Kelso, Holyrood, and Coldingham.

In April 1558 he wrote to Mary of Guise from Coldingham about a dispute amongst his tenants in Glasgow who were now threatened with legal action by Robert, Lord Sempill, as Sheriff of Renfrew. Stewart wanted Guise, who was now Regent of Scotland, to intervene in favour of his tenants.

During the Reformation Crisis the English government sent a fleet of warships to Scotland, and subsequently, by the Treaty of Berwick, an army to assist the Protestants at the siege of Leith. In January 1560 John Stewart sighted the English fleet commanded by William Wynter off Dunbar sailing towards the Isle of May and sent a boat to investigate.

=== Mary, Queen of Scots' personal rule ===
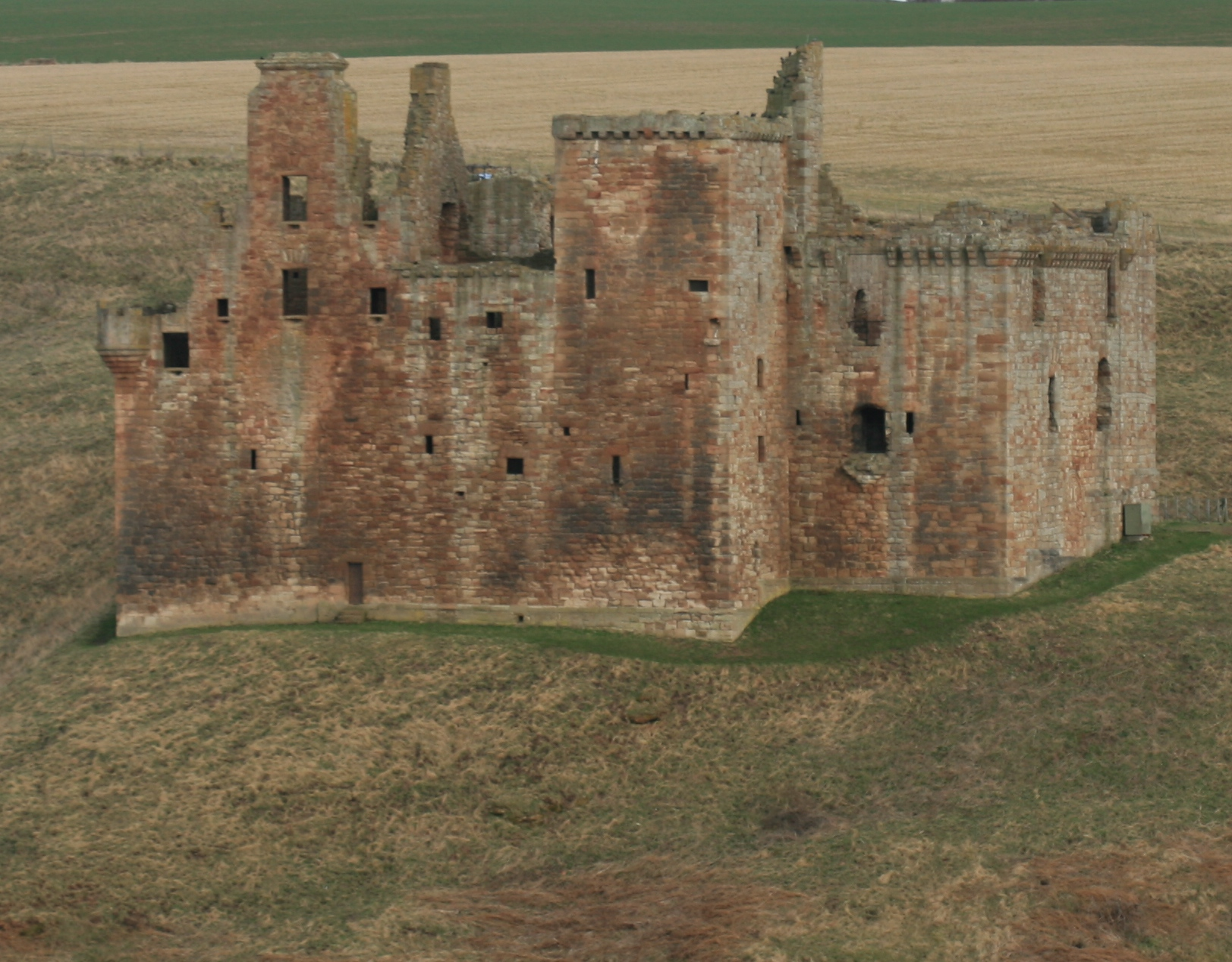
John Stewart's wedding was celebrated at Crichton Castle

Mary, Queen of Scots made him keeper of Dunbar Castle when she returned to Scotland in August 1561. The English diplomat Thomas Randolph wrote that Lord John was in the queen's favour in October 1561, for his "leaping and dancing", and would marry the Earl of Bothwell's sister, Jean Hepburn. She had previously been "handfasted" to another man, Robert Lauder younger of the Bass, on 24 July 1556, but the marriage was not completed.

Lord John, his half-brother Lord Robert, the Marquis of Elbeuf and others performed in a tournament in December 1561 on the sands of Leith. There was "running at the ring", with two teams of six men, one team dressed as women, the other as exotic foreigners in strange masque garments. Mary, Randolph, the French ambassador Paul de Foix, and Monsieur de Moret, envoy from the Duke of Savoy attended this entertainment. There had been a similar tournament at Amboise involving Mary's uncle Francis, the Grand Prior, dressed as a gypsy with a baby, and the Duke of Nemours as a townsman's wife with a bunch of keys, and in 1594 another event involving cross-dressing was staged at the baptism of Prince Henry at Stirling Castle.

Lord Robert married Jean Kennedy, sister of the Earl of Cassilis on 13 December 1561, and was subsequently given the title Lord Darnley. Soon after this Lord John was involved in a disturbance in Edinburgh that started as a kind of masque in the town. He and the Earl of Bothwell and the Marquis of Elbeuf went to the house of Cuthbert Ramsay where Alison Craik, a merchant's daughter and mistress of the Earl of Arran was lodged, wearing masks. When they were not admitted they broke down the doors. There were complaints to the queen and she issued a reprimand. Bothwell and Lord John ignored this and the next day there was a face-off between their followers and the Hamiltons in the market place.

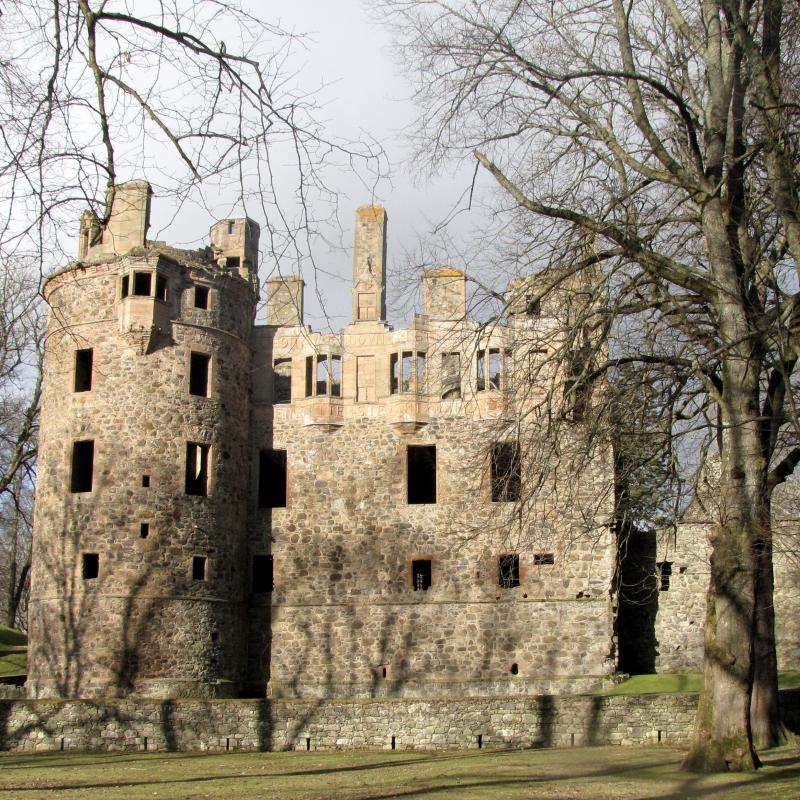
Lord John's efforts to capture the Earl of Huntly ended in failure.

Mary sent him to arrest the Earl of Huntly at Huntly Castle in October 1562. On the day William Kirkcaldy of Grange and the Tutor of Pitcur arrived first and surrounded the house. While Kirkcaldy was talking to the porter, the castle watchman on the tower spotted Coldingham and the Master of Lindsay and their troops a mile off. He alerted the Earl, who hopped over a low wall at the back of the castle and found a horse before Pitcur could stop him. Elizabeth Keith, Countess of Huntly then welcomed the queen's men in and gave them a meal and showed them around the place.

He entertained Mary at Dunbar Castle on 30 December 1562. John Stewart and John Erskine of Dun advised Queen Mary not to bring charges against for speaking in public about her marriage plans after an audience at Holyrood Palace. On 4 June 1563, Mary gave some of John Gordon's properties near Banff to "John Stewart, Lord Darnley", at this time the Darnley title was used by John Stewart, Commendator of Coldingham.

He died at Inverness in November 1563.

John Knox told a story about his last words. Someone told Mary, Queen of Scots that Stewart's deathbed wish was that she would become a Protestant. Mary declared without hesitation that this version of Coldingham's speech was a lie invented by the treasurer John Wishart of Pitarrow and her brother Moray's secretary John Wood.

== Marriage and children ==
He married Jean Hepburn, daughter of Patrick Hepburn, 3rd Earl of Bothwell. The wedding was celebrated at Crichton Castle on 3 January 1562. Mary, Queen of Scots and James Stewart, 1st Earl of Moray (a half-brother to both Mary and John) attended. The English diplomat Thomas Randolph, who was not invited, heard there was 'much good sport and pastimes.' Robert Lindsay of Pitscottie said the entertainments lasted four days. Their children included:

- Francis Stewart, who became Earl of Bothwell
- Christine Stewart, who was appointed to rock the cradle of Prince James in March 1568. Regent Moray and Regent Morton bought her clothes.
- Marjorie or Margaret Stewart, who was also in the king's household at Stirling before August 1570. She married (1) William Sinclair of Underhoull, Unst, a son of Olave Sinclair, (2) William Bruce of Symbister, a relation of Laurence Bruce of Cultmalindie.

John Stewart also had a son Hercules Stewart by an unknown mother.

After the death of the Commendator, Jean Hepburn married John, Master of Caithness. In 1567, she was said to be in the favour of Mary, Queen of Scots, instead of Margaret, Lady Rires.

== Ancestors ==
Ancestors of John Stewart, Commendator of Coldingham

8. James III of Scotland
4. James IV of Scotland
9. Margaret of Denmark
2. James V of Scotland
10. Henry VII of England
5. Margaret Tudor
11. Elizabeth of York
1. John Stewart, Commendator of Coldingham
12. John Carmichael, 2nd of Meadowflat
6. Sir John Carmichael, 3rd of Meadowflat
3. Elizabeth Carmichael
14. Robert Charteris, of Gaitslakis
7. Katharine Charteris
