= Hercules Stewart =

Hercules Stewart of Whitelaw (died 1595) was a Scottish landowner and outlaw supporter of Francis Stewart, 5th Earl of Bothwell.

== Early life ==
He was a son of John Stewart, Prior of Coldingham (d. 1563), who was an illegitimate son of James V of Scotland by his mistress Elizabeth Carmichael. Hercules Stewart was a half-brother of Francis Stewart, 5th Earl of Bothwell, son of Jean Hepburn. His half-sister Christiane Stewart was appointed as one of the ladies to rock the cradle of James VI in March 1568.

== Career as a rebel ==
A letter from an English soldier at Berwick denouncing a Captain Carey in 1588 claimed that he frequently allowed Hercules Stewart and the Earl of Bothwell access to the garrison town.

Hercules Stewart supported his brother, the rebel earl, against James VI of Scotland.

In 1591 Stewart and the younger Hamilton of Samuelston executed a man called Purdy without trial.

In March 1592 he was thought to be in hiding in Northumberland with the earl, the younger Laird of Niddry, and others who had tried to access the king's presence by force at Holyroodhouse. In June 1592 he was declared guilty of treason in the Parliament of Scotland. In November 1592 Hercules and a number of Bothwell's supporters, including John Wemyss of Logie, were pardoned for their treasons.

In April 1594 Bothwell's supporters dug in at Leith, repairing the old fortifications. They withdrew to Niddrie where, on 5 April 1594 Hercules Stewart was given command of a section of Bothwell's troops and fought and defeated the king's soldiers under the Master of Glamis and the Earl of Home, who split into two groups and retreated towards Edinburgh Castle and Holyroodhouse. This engagement is sometimes known as the "Battle of Leith".

Hercules Stewart wrote letters for the Earl of Bothwell, although the English agent George Nicholson and the courtier Roger Aston suggested that Hercules Stewart was not in the earl's confidence.

Stewart was denounced by the Privy Council of Scotland for conspiracy with Bothwell on 9 January 1595. The other conspirators were Alexander, Lord Spynie, Archibald Wauchope younger of Niddry, Gilbert Pennycuke, William Chirnsyde, Sym Armstrong of Whitehaugh, and Josias Stewart, brother of Andrew, Lord Ochiltree. Josias's mother and sisters were ladies in waiting to Anne of Denmark.

Stewart and William Trotter were captured by William Hume on 6 February 1595 at West Houses near Newbattle who tried to get him pardoned. It was suspected that Trotter incriminated Stewart. John Colville was at the arrest, and promised that he would be spared. Hercules and Josias Stewart was interrogated and revealed information about a band or league between Bothwell and the Catholic rebel Northern earls.

Stewart and a man called Sym (Sym Armstrong, younger of Whitehaugh) were hanged on 18 February 1595 in the market place of Edinburgh.

== Family ==
Hercules married Mary Whitelaw or Quhytlaw, daughter and co-heiress of Patrick Whitelaw of Whitelaw. They were divorced in 1592. In February 1593 she married William Hume, who worked in the king's stable.

They had a daughter, Margaret Stewart. In 1620, a French woman, Jacqueline Quenlie, petitioned the Privy Council of Scotland that John Hamilton of Ferguslie was her husband in Ireland, and he had married Margaret Stewart unlawfully and taken two coffers of her belongings to Paisley. Jacqueline then withdrew her claim to be the wife of John Hamilton and received her goods.
