= Jean Hepburn =

Scottish noblewoman (died 1599)

- Lady Darnley; Mistress of Caithness
- Born: Unknown; Crichton Castle, Midlothian, Scotland
- Died: 1599; Caithness
- Noble family: Hepburn
- Spouses: John Stewart, 1st Lord Darnley; John Sinclair, Master of Caithness; Archibald Douglas, Parson of Douglas
- Issue: Francis Stewart, 5th Earl of Bothwell; George Sinclair, 5th Earl of Caithness; Sir James Sinclair; Sir John Sinclair; Marie Sinclair; Bessie Sinclair
- Father: Patrick Hepburn, 3rd Earl of Bothwell
- Mother: Lady Agnes Sinclair

Jean Hepburn, Lady Darnley, Mistress of Caithness, Lady Morham (died 1599) was a Scottish noblewoman and a member of the Border clan of Hepburn. Her brother was James Hepburn, Earl of Bothwell, the third husband of Mary, Queen of Scots. Jean's first husband was John Stewart, 1st Lord Darnley, an illegitimate half-brother of Queen Mary, which made Jean a double sister-in-law of the queen. Jean married three times. She was also Lady of Morham, having received in 1573 the barony of Morham and lands which had belonged to her mother, Lady Agnes Sinclair and was forfeited to the Crown subsequent to her brother, the Earl of Bothwell's attainder for treason.

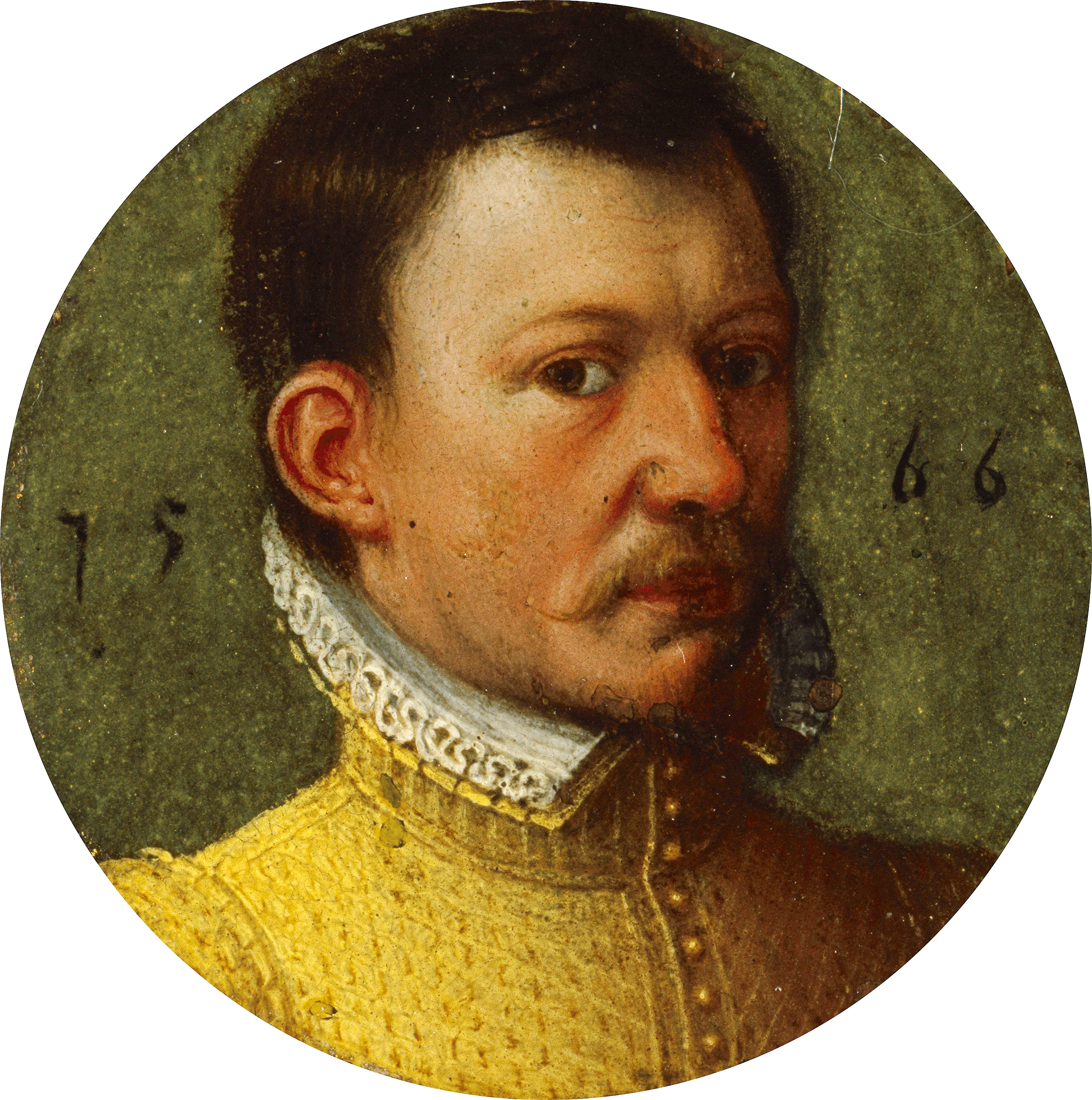
James Hepburn, Earl of Bothwell, brother of Jean Hepburn

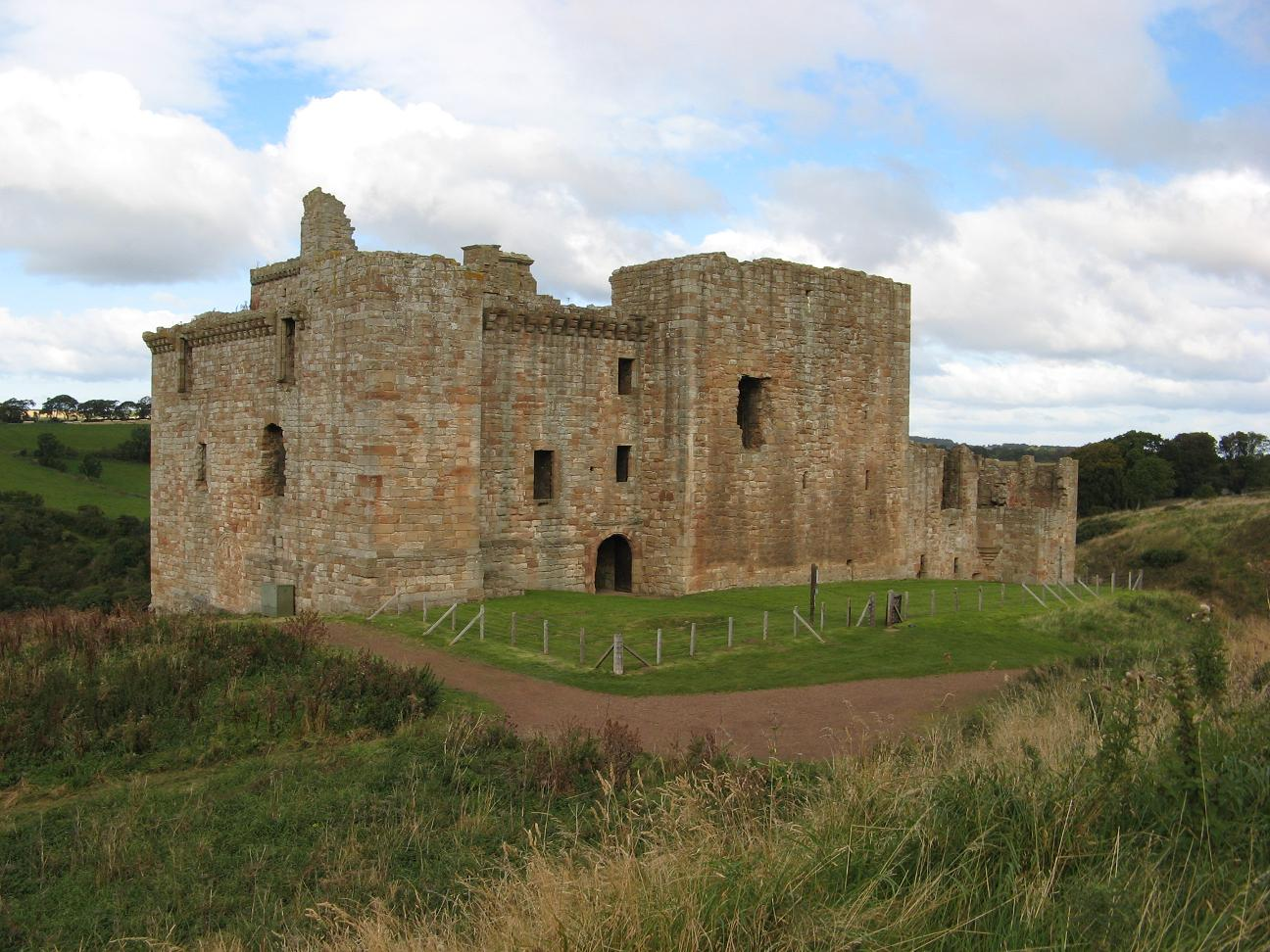
Crichton Castle, birthplace of Jean Hepburn

== Life ==
Lady Jean Hepburn was born at Crichton Castle, Midlothian, Scotland, the daughter of Patrick Hepburn, 3rd Earl of Bothwell and Lady Agnes Sinclair. Her parents obtained a divorce sometime before 16 October 1543, and Jean's mother was henceforth styled Lady Morham until her death in 1572.

Jean's paternal grandparents were Adam Hepburn, 2nd Earl of Bothwell and Agnes Stewart, and her maternal grandparents were Henry Sinclair, 3rd Lord St. Clair and Margaret Hepburn.

Lady Jean was sometimes known as Jane or Janet. She was sometimes called the "Mistress of Bothwell". In January 1560, the English agent Thomas Randolph wrote that he knew some scandal concerning Jean, 'a mirrie matter, worthe the reporting,' but gave no further detail.

Her brother was James Hepburn, 4th Earl of Bothwell, who would achieve notoriety as the third husband of Mary, Queen of Scots. He married firstly in February 1566, Lady Jean Gordon, a wealthy Highlands heiress, who was the sister of George Gordon, 5th Earl of Huntly. Bothwell and Jean were divorced on 7 May 1567, and eight days later, he married Queen Mary.

On 8 October 1573 at Edinburgh, a Tack was made to Jean Hepburn of the lands and barony of Morham which had originally belonged to her mother, and had been forfeited to the Crown subsequent to her brother the Earl of Bothwell's attainder for treason.

== Marriages and children ==
Jean Hepburn was "handfasted" to Robert Lauder younger of the Bass, on 24 July 1566, but the marriage was not completed.

On 4 January 1562, Jean Hepburn married John Stewart, an illegitimate son of King James V of Scotland by his mistress Elizabeth Carmichael. The wedding was celebrated at Crichton Castle and the festivities afterwards were hosted by her brother, the Earl of Bothwell. Queen Mary attended the wedding along with her other illegitimate half-brother and chief adviser James Stewart, 1st Earl of Moray. The English diplomat Thomas Randolph heard there was "much good sport and pastimes".

John Stewart was created 1st Lord Darnley that same year. They had three children:

- Francis Stewart, 5th Earl of Bothwell (December 1562 – 4 November 1613 Naples, Italy), who married Lady Margaret Douglas, daughter of David Douglas, 7th Earl of Angus and Margaret Hamilton, by whom he had six children.
- Christian Stewart, who was appointed to rock the cradle of James VI in 1568.
- Marjorie Stewart, who married (1) William Sinclair of Underhoull, Unst, (2) William Bruce of Symbister

John Stewart died in November 1563. Jean Hepburn married secondly John Sinclair, Master of Caithness, by whom she had five children:

- George Sinclair, 5th Earl of Caithness (c. 1566 – February 1643), married 29 July 1585 Lady Jean Gordon, daughter of George Gordon, 5th Earl of Huntly and Lady Anne Hamilton, by whom he had five children.
- Sir James Sinclair, married Elizabeth Stewart, by whom he had four children.
- Sir John Sinclair (died after 21 December 1627), married Janet Sutherland, by whom he had one son.
- Bessie Sinclair (died after 19 July 1574), married George MccLellan.
- Marie Sinclair (died after 20 February 1582), who married Sir John Home of Coldenknowes, their grandson was James Home, 3rd Earl of Home.

In 1567, following the Earl of Bothwell's abduction of Queen Mary to Dunbar Castle where he held her in captivity until she agreed to marry him, Jean Hepburn served as one of the queen's companions along with Janet Beaton, Bothwell's former mistress, and her sister, Margaret Beaton, Lady Reres. The queen was very fond of her former sister-in-law Jean, and gave her presents of a sequined crimson petticoat and a taffeta cloak. Shortly afterwards on 15 May, Queen Mary's disastrous marriage to Bothwell took place, making Jean Hepburn once again the sister-in-law of the queen.

Jean and her second husband, the Master of Sinclair, were divorced on 17 July 1575. He died in September 1575 in captivity after being imprisoned by his father following a quarrel.

In 1578, Jean married her third husband, Archibald Douglas, Parson of Douglas, a diplomat and political intriguer. He was involved in the conspiracy to assassinate Henry Stuart, Lord Darnley and was present at the Kirk o'Field on the night of the murder. In 1581, warned of his impending arrest for complicity in Lord Darnley's murder, he fled from Jean Hepburn's tower-house at Morham to England. On 21 November 1581, he was forfeited by an Act of Parliament. At his trial on 26 May 1586, he was acquitted of the murder.

Jean died in 1599 at Caithness. Her will was probated on 27 July 1599.
