= Stand-off dispute to the lands of Beauly Priory =

Dispute over the lands of Beauty Priory

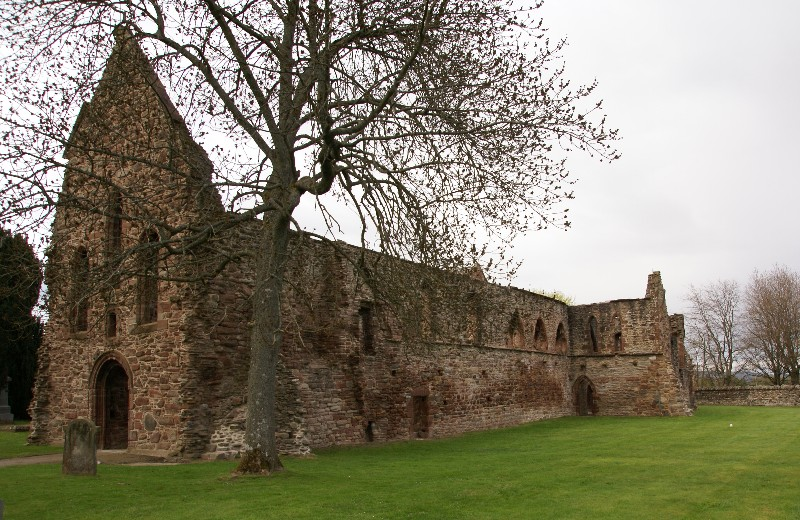
- The ruins of Beauly Priory
Date	1577–8
Location	Beauly, Inverness-shire, Scotland
Result	Mackenzies backed down and entered into peaceful negotiations

Belligerents
Clan Mackenzie	Clan Fraser of Lovat; Clan Munro

Commanders and leaders
Colin Cam Mackenzie, 11th of Kintail	Thomas Fraser of Knockie, Tutor to Lord Lovat; Robert Mor Munro, 15th Baron of Foulis

Strength
200 men	Frasers: 60 men + 2 field pieces Munros: 300 men

The dispute over the lands of Beauly Priory took place in about 1577-78 in Beauly, Inverness-shire, Scottish Highlands. It was contested between Colin Cam Mackenzie, 11th of Kintail, chief of Clan Mackenzie and Thomas Fraser of Knockie who was the tutor to the young Simon Fraser, 6th Lord Lovat, chief of the Clan Fraser of Lovat. Fraser was supported by Robert Mor Munro, 15th Baron of Foulis.

== Background ==
According to 19th-century historian Alexander Mackenzie, the dispute arose between Mackenzie of Kintail and Fraser the Tutor of Lovat because there were no fixed "marches" between the lands of Beauly Priory that were held by the Frasers, and the estates to the north of it that were held by the Mackenzies. Fraser's 17th century Wardlaw Manuscript states that the Mackenzies acted out of jealously for having lost the priory or because they were suspicious that there was a design to encroach upon their own marches, to which they had no formal legal title.

== The stand-off ==
Mackenzie of Kintail advanced with 200 men in arms and Fraser placed 60 men in the house of Beauly with two field pieces facing north. Mackenzie scouts were seen and Fraser's field pieces let off two or three shots. Meanwhile, Munro the Laird of Foulis marched with 300 of his men to the banks of the River Conon in support of Fraser. He then sent two of his chieftains to Mackenzie of Kintail asking if there was any difference between them and the Frasers and if there was that they would support Lord Lovat and the Frasers. Mackenzie replied that he had nothing against Lovat, the two Munro chieftains returned, Munro the Laird of Foulis dismissed his men home and then paid a visit to Lovat Castle to advise the young Simon Fraser, Lord Lovat. According to Alexander Mackenzie, the Mackenzies had been alarmed by the formidable array that opposed them and then entered on peaceful negotiations.

== Aftermath ==
Mackenzie also states that according to Mr Edmund Chisholm Batten, the terms included that Lord Lovat should marry Catherine, eldest daughter of Colin Mackenzie of Kintail, which he afterwards did at the age of seventeen.

== See also ==
- Lord Lovat
- Stand-off at the Fords of Arkaig
- Stand-off at Bengrime
