= James Stewart, 1st Earl of Buchan =

Scottish nobleman (1442–1499)

- 1st Earl of Buchan
- Tenure: 1469-1499
- Successor: Alexander Stewart, 2nd Earl of Buchan
- Full name: James Stewart
- Other titles: Sheriff of Forfar 1467; Sheriff of Banff 1470, Lord High Chamberlain of Scotland 1471-73, Warden of the East Marches 1479
- Born: 1442
- Died: 1499 (aged 56–57)
- Spouse: Margaret Ogilvy
- Issue: Alexander Stewart, 2nd Earl of Buchan; Lady Agnes Stewart; James Stewart, 1st Laird of Traquair; Elene Stewart.
- Father: James Stewart, the Black Knight of Lorne
- Mother: Joan Beaufort, Queen of Scots

James Stewart, 1st Earl of Buchan (1442–1499) was a Scottish noble. He was the uncle of James III of Scotland who granted him the Earldom of Buchan in 1469. Buchan repaid his nephew by fighting for his cause against rebellious southern barons. Through his marriage to Margaret Ogilvy he acquired the title Lord Auchterhouse.

== Life ==
James Stewart was the second son of Sir James Stewart, the Black Knight of Lorne, and Joan Beaufort, the widow of James I of Scotland. Known as "Hearty James", he was a younger brother of John Stewart, 1st Earl of Atholl, and a younger half-brother of James II of Scotland and Princess Margaret Stewart, first wife of Louis XI of France.

In 1467, his nephew James III granted him and his wife the lands of the Baronies of Strathalva and Down, with the Castle of Banff and the fishings of the water of River Deveron. In 1469, James III conferred on James the Earldom of Buchan (first of the third creation). In 1471 James was appointed Lord High Chamberlain of Scotland and in 1473 he travelled to France as an ambassador. When he returned from France he was made Warden of the East Marches.

James III conferred the estate of Traquair to William Rogers, an eminent musician, and one of his favourites. After holding the lands for upwards of nine years, Rogers sold them for an insignificant sum, in 1478, to Buchan.

When the southern barons entered into a conspiracy against the King, the Earl of Buchan remained loyal. The King crossed the River Forth, and passed into the northeastern counties, where a strong force rallied around him. He then marched south, and came in sight of the rebellious barons at Blackness in West Lothian, where the Earl of Buchan attacked and drove back the left wing of the insurgent army.

Negotiations were opened, and the Earl of Buchan insisted on severe measures against the insurgent nobles; but George Gordon, 2nd Earl of Huntly and William Hay, 3rd Earl of Erroll were opposed to this, and they retired to the north. It was evident, however, that Buchan's view was right. A pacification was arranged in May 1488, in which the barons promised to return to their allegiance and maintain the rights of the Crown and the peace of the kingdom; and the King disbanded his army and returned to Edinburgh.

However the rebellion continued and on 11 June 1488 at the Battle of Sauchieburn James III was defeated and killed. The victorious barons passed the night on the field of battle. On the following morning they proceeded to Linlithgow, issued a proclamation, and immediately seized the Royal treasure and the reins of Government. The Earls of Buchan, Huntly, and Lennox, Lord Forbes and others, who had fought for James III, were summoned to appear before Parliament and answer to a charge of treason.

Parliament met at Edinburgh on 6 October 1488 and considered the position of those who had been summoned for treason. The Earl of Buchan tendered his submission and was pardoned and restored to power. None of the others who were cited appeared, and consequently their possessions were placed at the disposal of Parliament.

In 1491 Buchan conferred Traquair, on his natural son James Stewart. Buchan died in 1499, and was succeeded by his son, Alexander, 2nd Earl of Buchan.

== Family ==
Before 1467 James Stewart married Margaret Ogilvy, the sole heiress of Sir Alexander Ogilvy of Auchterhouse, and by this marriage he gained the heritable sheriffship and barony of Forfar. They were parents to two children:

- Alexander Stewart, 2nd Earl of Buchan (d. 1505), who married firstly a woman named Isobel, and secondly Margaret, daughter of William Ruthven, first Lord Ruthven.
- Isabel or Jane Stewart (c 1470-1530), married Alexander Abernethy, 4th Lord Saltoun of Abernethy.

Buchan had several illegitimate children with his mistress Margaret Murray (b. ca. 1446), many of whom were later legitimized by a royal charter issued in 1488–1489.

- James Stewart, 1st Laird of Traquair (1480–1513), was the founder of the Traquair family. He was gifted the Traquair estate by his father in 1491. He obtained letters of legitimation, and married the heiress of the Rutherfords, with whom he received the estates of Rutherford and Wells in Roxburghshire. He was killed at the Battle of Flodden. He was the ancestor of John Stewart, 1st Earl of Traquair.
- Lady Agnes Stewart, married first Adam Hepburn, 2nd Earl of Bothwell in August 1511, secondly Alexander Home, 3rd Lord Home, thirdly Robert Maxwell, 5th Lord Maxwell and fourthly Cuthbert Ramsay, of Edinburgh. Adam Hepburn, 2nd Earl of Bothwell was killed at the Battle of Flodden on 9 September 1513, she died in February, 1557.
- Isabel Stewart, a mistress of James IV of Scotland, and mother of Lady Janet Stewart, who married 1st to Malcolm Fleming, 3rd Lord Fleming, and after his death was in turn a mistress of Henry II of France.
- Elene or Ellen Stewart, who was given a grant of the marriage of William Sinclair, son of Oliver Sinclair of Roslin in December 1511.

== Notes ==
Peerage of Scotland
New creation	Earl of Buchan; 1469–1499	Succeeded by Alexander Stewart
