= George Sinclair, 5th Earl of Caithness =

Scottish nobleman

George Sinclair
- Earl of Caithness
- Earl of Caithness Coat of Arms
- Predecessor: George Sinclair, 4th Earl of Caithness
- Successor: George Sinclair, 6th Earl of Caithness
- Died: February 1643
- Noble family: Clan Sinclair
- Father: John Sinclair, Master of Caithness
- Mother: Jean Hepburn

George Sinclair (died 1643) was a Scottish nobleman, the 5th Earl of Caithness and chief of the Clan Sinclair, a Scottish clan based in northern Scotland.

== Early life ==
George Sinclair, 5th Earl of Caithness was the eldest son of John Sinclair, Master of Caithness and his wife Jean, daughter of Patrick Hepburn, 3rd Earl of Bothwell. His father, the Master of Caithness, had obtained a charter from Mary, Queen of Scots by which the Earldom of Caithness became a ''male fee'', to him and his male heirs. According to Henderson, George Sinclair, 5th Earl of Caithness therefore succeeded his grandfather, George Sinclair, 4th Earl of Caithness in 1583. However, according to The Scots Peerage he succeeded his grandfather in 1582 and having then been a minor he was under the wardship of the Earl of Gowrie.

== Earl of Caithness ==
=== Clan feuds ===
George Sinclair, 5th Earl of Caithness's father, John Sinclair, Master of Caithness, had been killed in captivity inside Castle Sinclair Girnigoe by his own father, George Sinclair, 4th Earl of Caithness. George, 5th Earl of Caithness later killed the two men who had held his father in imprisonment in the castle, Ingram and David Sinclair, and in the traditional history of Caithness he is known as "Wicked George", but Roland Saint-Clair stated that this might be more fairly said of the 4th Earl. According to The Scots Peerage, George Sinclair, 5th Earl of Caithness received a remission under the Great Seal of Scotland along with twenty-two others on 19 May 1585 for the slaughter of David Hume of Crenschawis and two brothers who were of the name Sinclair. According to Roland Saint-Clair, this remission was from James VI of Scotland at Holyrood House and was a remission for the murder of the two Sinclair brothers who in turn had murdered his father.

According to historian Robert Mackay, quoting 17th-century historian Sir Robert Gordon, 1st Baronet, in 1585 a meeting took place at Elgin, Scotland between George Gordon, 1st Marquess of Huntly, Alexander Gordon, 12th Earl of Sutherland, George Sinclair, 5th Earl of Caithness and Huistean Du Mackay, 13th of Strathnaver. The purpose of the meeting, according to Robert Mackay, was to repair relations which had become damaged between the Earl of Sutherland, Earl of Caithness and Huistean Du Mackay (Hugh Mackay), due to actions by the Clan Gunn and Hugh Mackay in Assynt, both having gone there on the orders of the Earl of Caithness. However, historian Angus Mackay does not state that Hugh Mackay attended this meeting and that the purpose of the meeting was to break up the confederacy between Hugh Mackay and the Earl of Caithness. According to historian Robert Mackay, it was decided at the meeting that the Clan Gunn should be "made away", because they were judged to be the principal authors of these "troubles and commotions", but that both Hugh Mackay and George Sinclair, Earl of Caithness were unwilling to attack their old allies the Clan Gunn and therefore departed from the meeting at Elgin. In consequence, in 1586, George Gordon, Marquess of Huntly came north to Sutherland, the lands of his cousin, Alexander Gordon, 12th Earl of Sutherland. He sent a message to both Hugh Mackay and George Sinclair, Earl of Caithness to meet him at Sutherland's seat of Dunrobin Castle. According to historian Robert Mackay the Earl of Caithness met with the Gordons of Huntly and Sutherland but Mackay did not and was therefore denounced as a rebel. However, according to historian Angus Mackay, Hugh Mackay did attend this second meeting but refused the proposals of the Gordons of Huntly and Sutherland that the Gunns should be destroyed. However, the Earl of Caithness did indeed agree with the Gordons that the Gunns should be destroyed. Robert Mackay also states that the Earl of Caithness agreed with the Gordon's proposals at this second meeting to attack the Gunns. According to historian Robert Mackay, Sinclair, Earl of Caithness sent his men under the command of Henry Sinclair to attack the Gunns. In the subsequent Battle of Allt Camhna, the Gunns having been joined by the Mackays, defeated the Sinclairs and killed their leader Henry Sinclair, who was "cousin" of the Earl of Caithness.

According to Sir Robert Gordon (who himself was a son of Alexander Gordon, 12th Earl of Sutherland) in 1590, George, Earl of Caithness having been at feud for a few years with Alexander Gordon, 12th Earl of Sutherland, invaded Sutherland but was defeated at the Battle of Clynetradwell. However, according to early 20th-century historian Angus Mackay, Donald Balloch Mackay, half brother of Huistean Du Mackay, 13th of Strathnaver, saved the situation for the Earl of Caithness, and even the Gordon account states that Donald Balloch Mackay played the part of a good commander, having supported the Earl of Caithness and having been on the opposing side of the feud to his half-brother, Huistean who supported the Earl of Sutherland. Losses on each side were about equal.

The English ambassador Robert Bowes wrote in January 1592 that the Earl of Caithness had recently captured and hanged the eldest sons of Lachlan Mor Mackintosh and Angus Williams, with eight of their companions. It was thought that the Earl of Huntly was party to this action.

In 1601, there was a stand-off at Bengrime between the armies of the Earl of Caithness and the Earl of Sutherland. The Earl of Caithness sent messengers to the Earl of Sutherland offering peaceful proposals but these were refused and he was advised to stay where he was until the next day when he would be assured of battle. The Caithness men then fled and the Earl of Sutherland's army advanced with the Mackays on the right, the Munros and MacLeods on the left and the Sutherlands in the centre. The Earl of Sutherland's vanguard was led by Patrick Gordon and Donald Mackay. On reaching the Earl of Caithness's camp they found that their enemy had fled.

=== Charters ===
George Sinclair, 5th Earl of Caithness received charters from the Crown on 17 December 1591, 18 June 1606, 3 November 1612 and 9 June 1615. He resigned the earldom of Caithness on 3 April 1592, with the consent of his wife, Jean Gordon, Countess of Caithness, into the hands of James VI of Scotland. A charter was then granted to William Sinclair, his eldest son and heir, and also to his male heirs, under reservation of life rent and his wife's terce.

He was Sheriff of Caithness. This led to a dispute with George Keith, 5th Earl Marischal in 1610 because his tenants in Caithness were not subject to the Sheriff's jurisdiction. After a lawsuit from George Sinclair of Dunbeath, Marischal sold his Caithness lands to the earl.

=== Orkney expedition ===
In 1614, Robert Stewart, son of Patrick Stewart, 2nd Earl of Orkney had taken illegal control of Birsa Palace, Kirkwall Castle, the Palace of the Yards and other strongholds on the Orkney Isles. The Earl of Caithness was then in Edinburgh and offered to proceed to Orkney and vindicate the authority of the law, providing that he was given sufficient troops for the purpose. The Government agreed and in August 1614 he set sail from Leith with sixty soldiers and two pieces of cannon from Edinburgh Castle. On arriving at Caithness, the vessel brought up in Sinclairs Bay and having procured some additional troops from his own property, the earl, along with his natural brother Henry Sinclair, sailed directly for Orkney, disembarking his troops in Kirkwall. He then opened the campaign by besieging the different posts held by the insurgents. The last of these was Kirkwall Castle, which Robert Stewart, with only sixteen men, defended for three weeks. The prisoners were all brought to Edinburgh and executed, with the exception of Patrick Halcro whose betrayal had caused the castle to capitulate. In January 1615, the Earl of Caithness went to London and received an award accordingly.

George Sinclair, 5th Earl of Caithness died in February 1642-43 aged 77 and was succeeded by his great-grandson.

== Family ==
George Sinclair, 5th Earl of Caithness married Jean Gordon, daughter of George Gordon, 5th Earl of Huntly and Anne Hamilton and had the following children:

1. William Sinclair, Lord Berriedale, who married Mary, daughter of Henry Sinclair, 6th Lord Sinclair. William died before his father, leaving a son, John Sinclair, Master of Berriedale, who married Jean Mackenzie, daughter of Colin Mackenzie, 1st Earl of Seaforth. John Sinclair died in 1639, leaving three sons: George Sinclair, 6th Earl of Caithness, John Sinclair and William Sinclair.
2. Francis Sinclair of Northfield, Edinburgh, who married Elizabeth, daughter of Lord Fraser, and had a son, George Sinclair, 7th Earl of Caithness (originally of Keiss). Francis also left a daughter, "Lady Jean of Mey", who died in 1716. Francis also had a natural (illegitimate) daughter, Margaret, who in 1653 married John, son of Alexander Sutherland in Lybster.
3. Francis Sinclair, a natural (illegitimate) son who in about 1621 fought a duel with his relative, William Sinclair of Mey. From this Francis Sinclair descends the Sinclair of Stirkoke branch which includes George Sinclair who was killed in an expedition to Norway in 1612.
4. John Sinclair, a natural (illegitimate) son who attained the rank of Lieutenant-Colonel in the German wars.
5. Elizabeth Sinclair, married in 1621 to George Lindsay, 14th Earl of Crawford.

== See also ==
- Barony of Roslin
- Lord Sinclair
- Lord Herdmanston

Peerage of Scotland
Preceded by George Sinclair	Earl of Caithness; 1582–1643	Succeeded by George Sinclair
