= List of lord high admirals of Scotland =

Lord High Admiral of Scotland
- Status: Post abolished
- Formation: c. 15th century
- First holder: The 1st Earl of Orkney
- Final holder: The 4th Earl of Wemyss
- Abolished: 1707
- Succession: Lord High Admiral of Great Britain
- Deputy: Vice Admiral of Scotland

Lord High Admiral of Scotland was the name of one of the Great Officers of State of the Kingdom of Scotland before the Union with England in 1707.

The office was one of considerable power, also known as Royal Scottish Admiralty, including command of the King's ships and sailors (see Royal Scottish Navy) and inspection of all sea ports, harbours, and sea coasts. The Admiral appointed judges to decide causes relating to maritime affairs, including both civil and criminal jurisdiction, and jurisdiction over creeks, fresh and navigable waterways. The duties were exercised through vice-admirals and admirals-depute, later called judge admirals.

The office seems to have originated in the early 15th century and was once held by Sir Robert Logan of Grugar, later also of Restalrig and the Earls of Bothwell and the Dukes of Lennox. It was one of the heritable offices that Charles II gave to his illegitimate son Charles Lennox, 1st Duke of Richmond and Lennox.

The earliest surviving records of the Scottish High Court of Admiralty date from 1557, convened under the authority of James Hepburn, 4th Earl of Bothwell, in Edinburgh or Leith. Although all maritime causes in Scotland below a river's first bridge were in its view, it was inferior to the Court of Session, and its authority was contested by the Court of Justiciary in criminal matters. The Court was formally to be held, fenced, within the sea-flood and wherever it was actually held the Admiral would declare that to be the case. The judges were Bothwell's two vice-admirals, men otherwise unknown who were almost certainly professional lawyers rather than mariners.

By the Act of Union 1707 all admiralty jurisdictions were placed under the Lord High Admiral of Great Britain or Commissioners of the Admiralty. Nevertheless, the Vice-Admiral of Scotland who received his commission from the Crown continued to appoint the Judge Admiral (until 1782) and admirals-depute and to rank as an Officer of the Crown.

The Public Offices (Scotland) Act 1817 provided that no person thereafter appointed as Vice Admiral should receive a salary. The Admiralty Court in Edinburgh was abolished in 1830 and the Court of Session granted subject-matter jurisdiction.

== List of lord high admirals ==
- Henry Sinclair, 1st Earl of Orkney
- George Crichton, 1st Earl of Caithness (Third Creation)
- William Sinclair, 1st Earl of Caithness (Fourth Creation)
- David Lindsay, 1st Duke of Montrose
- Alexander Stewart, 1st Duke of Albany
- Sir Robert Logan of Grugar, later also of Restalrig 1400
- David Lindsay, 1st Earl of Crawford before 1403
- Patrick Hepburn, 1st Earl of Bothwell appointed 1488.
- James Hamilton, 1st Earl of Arran sailed with royal fleet 1502, 1504–5, 1513
- Archibald Douglas, 5th Earl of Angus
- Robert Maxwell, 5th Lord Maxwell
- Adam Hepburn, 2nd Earl of Bothwell appointed 1508 in succession to his father.
- Patrick Hepburn, 3rd Earl of Bothwell appointed 1513, duties performed by Patrick Hepburn, Prior of St. Andrews.
- James Hepburn, 4th Earl of Bothwell appointed 1556.
- James Douglas, 4th Earl of Morton appointed 1568.
- Francis Stewart, 1st Earl of Bothwell (Second Creation) appointed 1581, confirmed 1587.
- Ludovic Stewart, 2nd Duke of Lennox appointed 1591.
- James Stewart, 4th Duke of Lennox 1626
- Alexander Bruce, 2nd Earl of Kincardine 1668
- James, Duke of York and Albany 1673
- William Douglas, Duke of Hamilton 1692
- Charles Lennox, 1st Duke of Richmond and 1st Duke of Lennox 1694
- James Graham, 1st Duke of Montrose 1702
- David Wemyss, 4th Earl of Wemyss 1706–1707, thereafter Vice-Admiral

== List of vice admirals ==
- 1708 David Wemyss, 4th Earl of Wemyss
- 1714 John Hamilton-Leslie, 9th Earl of Rothes
- 1727 Charles Douglas, 3rd Duke of Queensberry
- 1729 John Dalrymple, 2nd Earl of Stair
- 1733 George Douglas, 13th Earl of Morton
- 1738 James Ogilvy, 5th Earl of Findlater
- 1764 John Carmichael, 3rd Earl of Hyndford
- 1767 William Douglas, 4th Duke of Queensberry
- 1776 John Campbell, 3rd Earl of Breadalbane and Holland
- 1782 Lord William Gordon
- 1795 William Cathcart, 1st Earl Cathcart (to 1843)
