= Stand-off at Bengrime =

- Part of Clan Sutherland – Clan Sinclair feud
- Coats of arms of the Earl of Sutherland (left) and Earl of Caithness (right)
Date	1601
Location	Bengrime, Sutherland, Scotland
Result	No battle

Belligerents
Army of the Earl of Caithness: Clan Sinclair	Army of the Earl of Sutherland: Clan Sutherland; Clan Mackay; Clan Munro; MacLeods of Assynt

Commanders and leaders
George Sinclair, 5th Earl of Caithness	John Gordon, 13th Earl of Sutherland

Casualties and losses
None	None

The Stand-off at Bengrime took place in 1601 and was a stand-off between the armies of John Gordon, 13th Earl of Sutherland (chief of Clan Sutherland) and George Sinclair, 5th Earl of Caithness (chief of Clan Sinclair). Bengrime is in the county of Sutherland, Scotland.

== Background ==
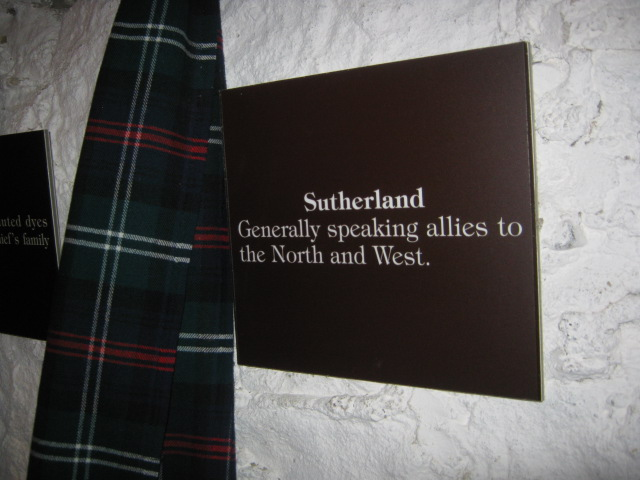
Clan Sutherland tartan in the Clan Munro exhibition at the Storehouse of Foulis

In the late 16th century and early 17th century the Earls of Sutherland and Caithness had long been at feud. The feud also involved Huistean Du Mackay, 13th of Strathnaver, chief of Clan Mackay and in 1595 the Privy Council of Scotland bound all three over to keep the peace and made the Earl of Caithness find caution of 20,000 merks. According to historian Alexander Mackenzie in 1601 the Earl of Caithness had attempted to hunt on the Earl of Sutherland’s lands. Although according to historian Angus Mackay, the Earl of Caithness had attempted to hunt in the Reay Forest which belonged to Huistean Du Mackay of Strathnaver. Angus Mackay states that the Earl of Sutherland, Munro of Contullich Castle and the MacLeods of Assynt then came to the aid of Huistean Du Mackay. Alexander Mackenzie however stated that the Mackays, Munros and MacLeods went to the assistance of the Earl of Sutherland. The Earl of Caithness hearing of the army that had been raised against him gathered his vassals and advanced into the county of Sutherland as far as a place called Bengrime. The Earl of Sutherland’s forces were camped about three miles away.

== The stand-off ==
The Earl of Caithness sent messengers to the Earl of Sutherland offering peaceful proposals but these were refused and he was advised to stay where he was until the next day when he would be assured of battle. The Caithness men then fled and the Earl of Sutherland’s army advanced with the Mackays on the right, the Munros and MacLeods on the left and the Sutherlands in the centre. The Earl of Sutherland's vanguard was led by Patrick Gordon and Donald Mackay. On reaching the Earl of Caithness’s camp they found that their enemy had fled.

== Aftermath ==
To mark their bloodless triumph, the Munros, Mackays, MacLeods and Sutherlands raised a heap of stones near the mountain Ben Griam which was named Carn Teichidh meaning Cairn of Flight. According to Alexander Mackenzie the Munros were disappointed not to have engaged in battle. The Earl of Caithness made another attempt in 1607 but was again unsuccessful.

== See also ==
- Earl of Sutherland
- Clan Sutherland
- Earl of Caithness
- Clan Sinclair
- Stand-off at the Fords of Arkaig
