= Bothwell (surname) =

Bothwell is a Scottish surname. Notable people with the surname include:

- Dorr Bothwell (1902–2000), American artist
- Fluff Bothwell, American football player
- Francis Bothwell of Edinburgh, 16th-century Scottish merchant, landowner, judge and member of the Scottish Parliament
- John Bothwell (bishop) (1926–2014), Canadian Anglican bishop and writer
- Robert Bothwell (born 1944), Canadian historian and writer
