= Prior of Coldingham =

Roman Catholic Church title

The Prior of Coldingham was the head of the Benedictine monastic community of Coldingham Priory in Berwickshire, Scotland. The priory was founded during the reign of David I of Scotland, although his older brother and predecessor, King Edgar of Scotland, had granted the land of Coldingham to the Church of Durham in 1098 AD, and a church was built by him and presented in 1100. The first prior is recorded by 1147, although an earlier foundation is likely. The monastic cell was a dependency of Durham until the 1370s, and in 1378 King Robert II of Scotland expelled the Durham monks; for the following century, the cell had two priors: one chosen by Durham and one by the Scots. It later became a dependency of Dunfermline Abbey. It was subject to increasingly secular control from the late 15th century into the 16th century.

== List of priors ==
- Edward, fl. 1124 x 1153
- H.[...], fl. 1147 x 1150
- Sampson, fl. x 1159-1161 x 1162
- Alan, fl. 1165 x 1173
- Herbert, 1172x1174-1175
- Bertram, 1188-1189
- Simon, 1189 x 1203
- Radulf, x 1203-x 1207
- Ernald, x 1207-1208 x 1211
- Thomas, 1212-1221 x
- Radulf, 1218 x 1234
- Thomas de Melsonby, 1229-1234
- Anketin, 1239-1242
- Bertram de Mediltone, 1242 x 1244
- Richard, x 1245-1247 or 1248
- Henry de Sylton, 1248-1260
- German, 1260
- Roger de Wolviston, 1263-1274 x 1276
- Henry de Horncastre, 1276-1296
- William de Midilton, 1304
- William de Gretham, 1304-1305
- Adam de Pontefract, 1309-1311
- William de Gretham, 1311-1321
- Richard de Whitworth, 1322-1325
- Adam de Pontefract, 1325-1332
- Robert de Graystanes, 1333
- Alexander de Lamsley, 1334
- William de Scaccario, 1336 x 1337
- Alexander de Lamsley, 1338-1339
- John Fossour, 1340-1341
- Walter de Skaresbrekis, 1341-1354
- William de Bamburgh, 1355-1362
- Robert Berrington de Walworth, 1363-1374
- Robert de Claxton, 1374 x 1379

== List of priors with allegiance to Durham ==
- Robert de Claxton, 1374-1391
- John de Ayclif, 1392-1416
- William Drax, 1418-1441
- John Oil, 1441-1447
- Thomas Nesbitt, 1447-1456
- John Pencher, 1456-1465 x 1467
- Thomas Haughton, 1467
- Thomas Wren, 1470

== List of priors with allegiance to Dunfermline ==
- Adam de Carale, 1374 x 1379
- Michael de Inverkeithing, 1379-1389
- William Reid, 1389-1390
  - Simon Marischal, 1389
- John Steele, 1390-1402
- Alan de Lyn, 1402
- Richard Mongal, 1402-1409
- Andrew Raburn, 1409-1414 x 1418
- Robert Bowmaker, 1419
- William Brown, 1419-1430
- Stephen Bryg, 1432
- William Boyce, 1442-1445

== List of prior-commendators ==
- Patrick Home, 1461-1478
- John Home, 1464-1503
- Ninian Home, 1501-1508
- John Home, 1509
- Alexander Stewart, 1510-1513
- David Home, 1513-1517
  - Thomas Nudre, 1514
- Robert Blackadder, 1518-1519
- William Douglas, 1519 -1526
  - George Patricii, 1520
  - Patrick Blackadder of Tulliallan, 1521 -1525
  - Andrew Home, 1522
  - John Forman, 1523
- Adam Blackadder, 1523-1541
- John Stewart, Commendator of Coldingham, 1541-1563
- Francis Stewart, earl of Bothwell, 1565-1567
- John Maitland, 1st Lord Maitland of Thirlestane, 1567-1571
- Alexander Home I [senior], 1570
- Alexander Home II [junior], 1571-1587
- Francis Stewart, earl of Bothwell (again), 1584-1590
- John Stewart, 1589-1592
- Alexander Home, 6th Lord Home, 1592-1606

== See also ==
- Coldingham
- Coldingham Priory
- Coldingham Bay
- Prior of Durham
