= John Sinclair, Master of Caithness =

Scottish nobleman

George Sinclair
- Master of Caithness
- Predecessor: George Sinclair, 4th Earl of Caithness
- Successor: George Sinclair, 5th Earl of Caithness
- Died: 15 March 1576
- Noble family: Clan Sinclair
- Father: George Sinclair, 4th Earl of Caithness
- Mother: Elizabeth Graham

John Sinclair, Master of Caithness (died 1576) was a Scottish nobleman.

== Early life ==
John Sinclair, Master of Caithness was the eldest son of George Sinclair, 4th Earl of Caithness and his wife Lady Elizabeth Graham, daughter of William Graham, 2nd Earl of Montrose.

== Master of Caithness ==
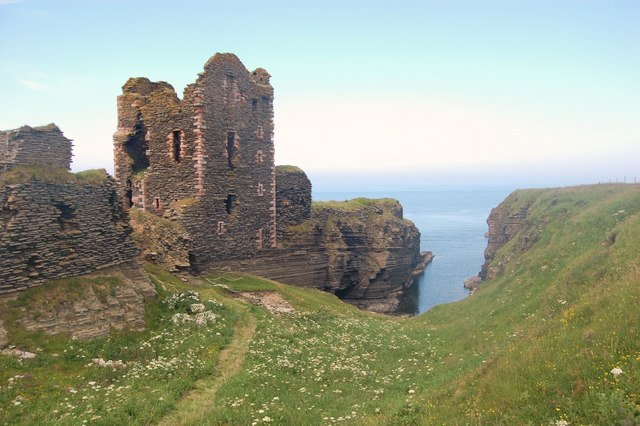
Castle Sinclair Girnigoe, Caithness

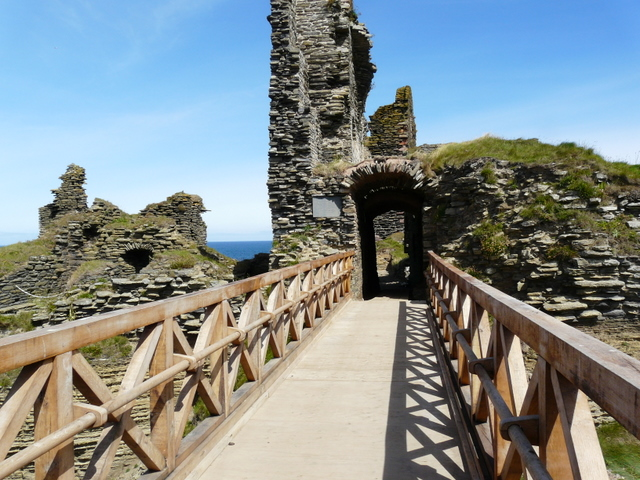
Footbridge into Castle Sinclair Girnigoe

John Sinclair, Master of Caithness received a charter for the earldom of Caithness and to his male heirs dated 2 October 1545.

In July 1569 the Master of Caithness besieged Lord Oliphant and his servants for 8 days in Old Wick or "Auldwick" castle near Wick.

His father, George, Earl of Caithness had feuded with the Earl of Sutherland and the Murrays of Aberscross which had resulted in the Battle of Torran-Roy in 1570 where Caithness was initially defeated, but returned to besiege the Murrays at Dornoch where several of them were subsequently beheaded. John Sinclair, Master of Caithness was later imprisoned by his father for making peace with the Murrays.

The Master of Caithness died at Castle Sinclair Girnigoe in 1576, and this was apparently by famine and vermine. A man named Murdoch Roy was accused by the Earl of Caithness of planning the escape of the Master of Caithness, and Roy was subsequently hanged. According to Roland Saint-Clair, food was withheld from the Master of Caithness for a few days, he was then supplied with abundantly salted beef. This brought on a raging thirst, but he was denied water and left to die in agony. His remains were interred in the "Sinclair Aisle" in the churchyard of Wick which his father had built some years before. The inscription over his grave read: "Here lies the entombed ane noble and worthie man, John, Master of Caithness, who departed this life in the 15th day of March, 1576".

== Family ==
In 1543, John Sinclair, Master of Caithness had obtained a charter from Mary, Queen of Scots by which the Earldom of Caithness became a male fee, to him and his male heirs. In around 1566, he married Jean Hepburn, daughter of Patrick Hepburn, 3rd Earl of Bothwell and had the following children:

1. George Sinclair, 5th Earl of Caithness.
2. James Sinclair, 1st of Murkle, who married Elizabeth Stewart, third daughter of Robert Stewart, 1st Earl of Orkney. He received a charter for the lands of Halcro, Orkney and was styled as Master of Caithness.
3. John Sinclair, 1st of Greenland and Rattar.
4. Agnes Sinclair.
5. Henry Sinclair, a natural (illegitimate) son, who married Janet Sutherland and had a son, John, who is probably the ancestor of the Sinclairs of Lybster. Henry Sinclair accompanied George, Earl of Caithness in an expedition to Orkney, where, whilst besieging Kirkwall Castle, he died in bad health.
6. According to Henderson, a historian named Douglas gives the Master of Caithness another legitimate son named David, but that this is an error. However, Henderson does confirm that this David Sinclair was the laird of Stirkoke who descended from an illegitimate son of George Sinclair, 5th Earl of Caithness, and who was the father of George Sinclair who was killed in an expedition to Norway in 1612. According to Roland Saint-Clair, David Sinclair, was a natural (illegitimate) son of the Master of Caithness, who acquired Stirkoke in 1587 and who was legitimated in 1588. He left a son, John, who was slain at Thurso in 1612. He also left a natural son, Colonel George Sinclair, ambushed in Norway.

== See also ==
- Earl of Caithness
- Barony of Roslin
- Lord Sinclair
- Lord Herdmanston
