= Patrick Hepburn, 1st Earl of Bothwell =

Lord High Admiral of Scotland (died 1508)

Patrick Hepburn, 1st Earl of Bothwell (died 18 October 1508) was Lord High Admiral of Scotland. He rose to political prominence after supporting James IV against his father, and was proxy at the King's marriage.

== Career ==
Patrick was the son of Adam Hepburn, Master of Hailes, and succeeded his grandfather also Patrick Hepburn as the 2nd Lord Hailes in (1482/1483). He or his grandfather held Berwick Castle against an English army led by Richard, Duke of Gloucester until the last week of August 1482, after which Berwick upon Tweed became a possession of England.

Under his territorial designation of "Patrick Hepburn of Dunsyre," he was made Sheriff of Berwickshire on 15 June 1480. Patrick Hepburn, Lord Hailes, was one of the Conservators of a truce with England on 20 September 1484. He was one of the leaders of the Confederate Lords who rebelled against King James III of Scotland, and he led the vanguard against the Royal array at the battle of Sauchieburn, 11 July 1488. Robert Birrel, a 16th-century writer, believed that he was one of those responsible for the murder of the king after the battle.

In the reign of James IV he rose to great power and held many offices including: Master of the King's Household, custodian of Edinburgh Castle, and Sheriff Principal of Edinburgh and Haddington. His son and heir Adam Hepburn, 2nd Earl of Bothwell was made Master of the Royal Stables. Patrick Hepburn was appointed Lord High Admiral of Scotland on 10 September 1488.

In September 1491, Bothwell went on a diplomatic mission to France to renew the Auld Alliance. He left from North Berwick aboard the Katherine. His fellow ambassadors were Robert Blackadder, Archbishop of Glasgow and the Dean of Glasgow. On 13 October 1488, he had a Crown charter of the feudal lordships of Chrichton and Bothwell, which were in the King's hands following the forfeiture of John Ramsay, Lord Bothwell. On 17 October the lordship of Bothwell was erected into an Earldom in his favour, and he was created the 1st Earl of Bothwell.

On 6 March 1492, he had a charter of the lands and lordship of Liddesdale, with Hermitage Castle, and more, upon the resignation of the same by Archibald Douglas, 5th Earl of Angus, the latter getting the lordship of Bothwell [but not the Earldom] which Patrick in turn resigned.

Patrick Hepburn was appointed Captain of Dumbarton Castle on 1 April 1495. He was one of the diplomats sent to conclude the treaty for the marriage of James IV with Princess Margaret Tudor of England in October 1501, and he stood proxy for the King at the ceremony of betrothal on 25 January 1502 at Richmond Palace. When Margaret Tudor came to Scotland in 1503 there was a tournament at Holyrood Palace, Hepburn and the English Earl of Surrey presided over the events while the king and queen watched from the palace windows. Hepburn played golf with James IV in Edinburgh in February 1504.

== Family ==
He married twice:

- Janet or Joanna Douglas, before February 1481, (d. before 21 February 1491), daughter of James Douglas, 1st Earl of Morton by his spouse, Princess Joanna Stewart. They had one daughter:
  - Joanna Hepburn aka Jane/Janet (Lady Seton), (d. 1558), married to George Seton, 5th Lord Seton, who fell at Flodden.
- Margaret Gordon, by contract dated 21 February 1491, daughter of George Gordon, 2nd Earl of Huntly. They had four sons and a daughter:
  - Adam Hepburn, 2nd Earl of Bothwell, who succeeded him.
  - Patrick Hepburn of Bolton
  - William Hepburn of Rollandston
  - John Hepburn, Bishop of Brechin
  - Margaret Hepburn, married Archibald Douglas, 6th Earl of Angus

Military offices
| Preceded by Alexander Stewart | Lord High Admiral of Scotland; 1502– | Succeeded by James Hamilton |
Peerage of Scotland
| New creation | Earl of Bothwell; 1488–1508 | Succeeded by Adam Hepburn |
| Preceded by Patrick Hepburn | Lord Hailes; 1483–1508 | Succeeded by Adam Hepburn |
