= Francis Stewart, 5th Earl of Bothwell =

Scottish nobleman (1562–1612)

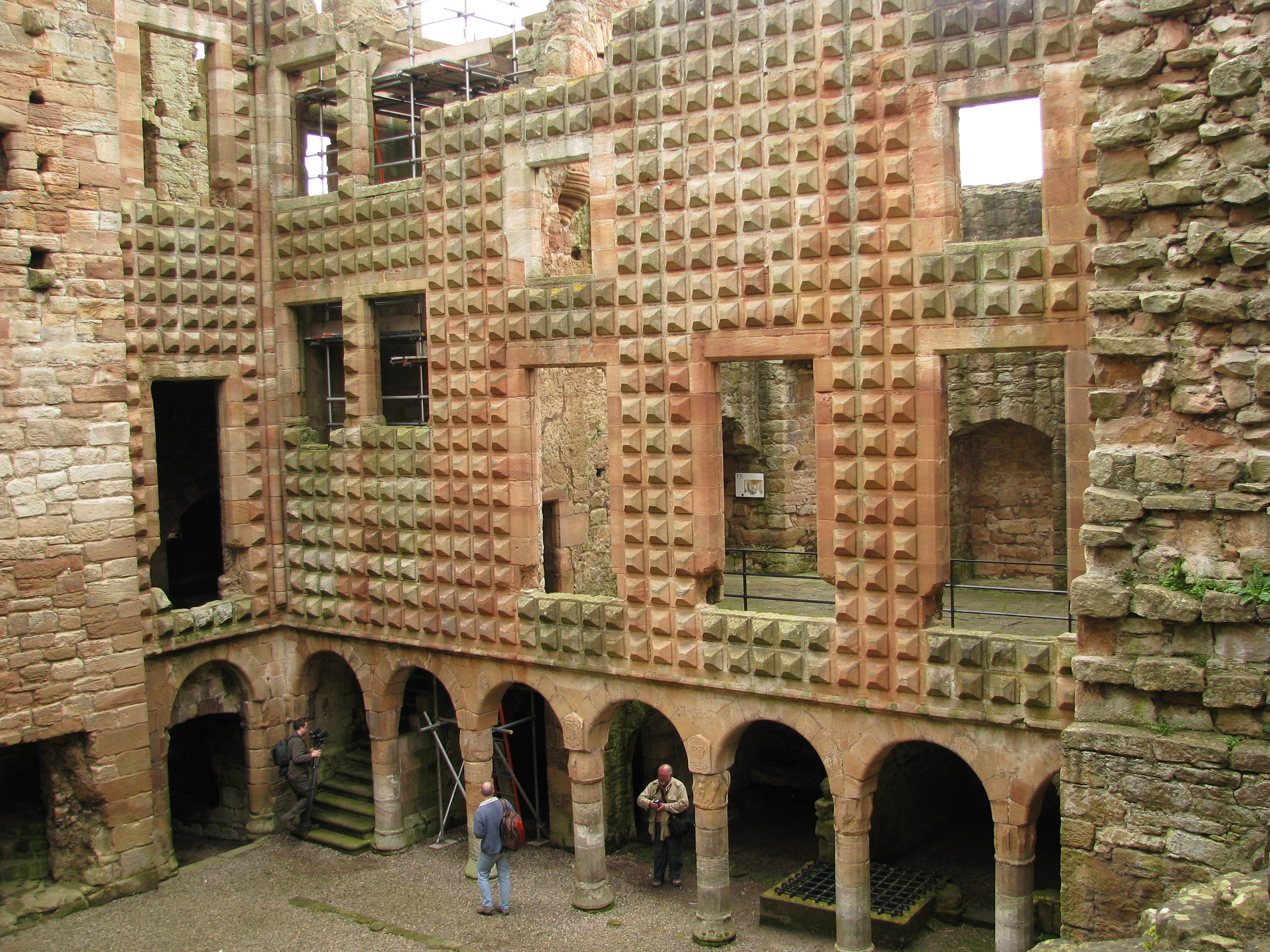
Bothwell had part of Crichton Castle rebuilt in the Italian Renaissance style, c. 1585

Francis Stewart, 5th Earl of Bothwell (c. December 1562 – November 1612), was Commendator of Kelso Abbey and Coldingham Priory, a Privy Counsellor and Lord High Admiral of Scotland. He was a notorious conspirator who led several uprisings against his first cousin, King James VI (they were both grandsons of King James V of Scotland), all of which ultimately failed, and he died in poverty in Italy after being banished from Scotland. Francis's maternal uncle, the 4th Earl of Bothwell (by the first creation), was the chief suspect in the murder of James VI's father, Lord Darnley.

== Family ==
Francis Stewart was a son of John Stewart, Prior of Coldingham (d. 1563), who was an illegitimate child of James V of Scotland by his mistress Elizabeth Carmichael. Francis' mother was Jane Hepburn, Mistress of Caithness, Lady Morham (d. 1599), sister of James Hepburn, 1st Duke of Orkney and 4th Earl of Bothwell. Francis is said to have been born in his mother's tower house at Morham.

In 1565, Mary, Queen of Scots, gave Francis a set of red serge bed curtains. When Mary was pregnant in 1566, she made a will bequeathing her jewels. If she had died in childbed, Francis would have received several sets of gold buttons and aiglets, and a slice of unicorn horn mounted on silver chain, used to test for poison.

== Commendator, earl, and student ==
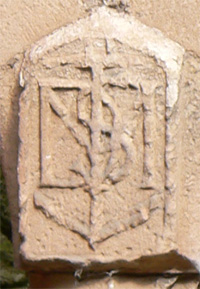
Carved monogram of Admiral Francis Stewart and Margaret Douglas, Crichton Castle

Regardless of his youth, in December 1564, he was made Lord Badenoch and Enzie, and in 1566 he was appointed (nominal) Commendator of Culross Abbey. He was, before 1568, Commendator of Kelso Abbey in Roxburghshire, a position he had exchanged with John Maitland for the offer of Coldingham Priory, which Maitland then held until his forfeiture in 1570. Some historians give Sir Alexander Home as Maitland's successor; he, in fact, declined to accept his appointment, and Priory charters record Francis Stewart as the next Commendator. Francis was succeeded as Prior of Coldingham by his second son, John.

On 10 January 1568, Francis was confirmed in the lands and baronies formerly held by the Earls of Bothwell. These included Hailes, Yester, Dunsyre, Morham, Crichton, Wilton, Bothwell, many others in the sheriffdoms of Edinburgh, Roxburgh, Lanark, Dumfries, and Berwick, and the Stewartries of Annandale and Kirkcudbright.

A letter of Marie Pieris, Lady Seton to Mary, Queen of Scots, mentioned that Francis was "at the Schools, and in good health" in August 1570. His sister Christine was in the king's household at Stirling Castle, but another sister (who is less well-documented) had been sent away by Annabell Murray, Countess of Mar.

Francis was 'belted' as Earl of Bothwell by his cousin, James VI, in the Great Hall of Stirling Castle on 27 November 1577, in the presence of his guardian, the 4th Earl of Morton, four days before his marriage to Margaret Douglas, formerly Lady Buccleuch and daughter of the 7th Earl of Angus, in Holyrood Abbey. Francis studied at the University of St Andrews before travelling in 1578 to the Universities of Paris and Rouen (and possibly also to Italy). Recalled to Scotland by the king, he landed at Newhaven in June 1582.

== Feuds and military affairs ==
On 29 May 1583, the King, against the advice of the Earl of Gowrie and the other Lords of the Raid of Ruthven, who had controlled him for the past nine months, left Edinburgh, progressing first to Linlithgow Palace, accompanied by the Earls of Mar, Angus, Bothwell and Marischal. At Linlithgow, Bothwell played football with the Earl Marischal. Bothwell knocked him over, and he then kicked Bothwell on the leg. They decided to fight a duel the next day, but the Earl of Angus and the king, James VI, reconciled them. After this, Bothwell returned to Crichton.

Bothwell quarreled with David Home of Manderston at Linlithgow Palace in November 1583. He killed him in 1584 and, on 23 October 1584, he wrote from Crichton Castle to Sir Patrick Vans of Barnbarroch, asking him to meet him at Dalkeith and support him at his trial in Edinburgh. He also fought with Alexander Home, Prior of Coldingham, and his brother, in the Canongate near Holyrood Palace in November 1583.

On 13 May 1585, Bothwell, with others, was commissioned to assist the Warden of the Scottish Marches dealing with rebels. In June 1586, Bothwell was one of three Commissioners appointed by James VI to negotiate a military alliance between the English and Scottish Crowns, which was formally concluded on 5 July. He quarrelled with William Stewart of Monkton and then they fought on Blackfriar's Wynd. Bothwell stabbed him with his rapier and Stewart tried to hide in a cellar, where Bothwell's men "stobbed him with whingers till he was despatched".

The following year, Bothwell and other nobles felt that the beheading of James VI's mother Queen Mary demanded an invasion of England, a course of action the king disagreed with. Bothwell was warded for a time in Edinburgh Castle for his activities in trying to advance this course of action.

On 10 May 1587, Bothwell and other nobles protested their innocence over a raid on Stirling Castle in November 1585. The king accepted their oaths and declared them to be his "honest and true servants".

Francis, Earl Bothwell, swore an obligation in Council on 8 July 1587 as Keeper of Liddesdale to keep the peace there, and on 29 July he was made a full member of the Privy Council of Scotland – a body he had been attending since at least 1582. He attended the wedding of Henrietta Stewart and the Earl of Huntly in July 1588, and his own appearance "set around with mirrors" drew attention.

One of the honours he received with his earldom was that of Lord High Admiral of Scotland, and on 1 August 1588, he was ordered "to attend upon his awne charge of admirallitie" in order to resist the Spanish Armada. He remained active at sea, and on 12 November of the same year Frederick Freis, master of the Swedish ship Unicorn, brought an action in the Scottish Privy Council against the Earl Bothwell for the seizure of his ship. The Council ordered Bothwell to restore the ship to Freis within 24 hours.

Bothwell was imprisoned in Holyrood Palace in May 1589, and called to James VI who was in the garden for his release. The king ignored him, and he was transferred to Blackness Castle and Tantallon Castle. Bothwell was so angry that he beat his wife and any of his servants who came near him. In 1589 an English pirate called Captain Coupland stole one of Bothwell's ships or barques and sold its cannon at Bridlington and Great Yarmouth.

== Outlaw and exile ==
Bothwell, with others, including the Earl of Huntly, was charged with treason for engaging in an armed uprising and plotting to seize the king at Holyroodhouse. He surrendered himself on 11 May 1589 and their trial took place on 24 May. All were found guilty, but sentences were deferred for the king's consideration.

In January 1591 he was reported to have bought the Isle of May and to be building a house near Kelso not far from the English border. This may refer to the repair of Moss Tower at Eckford.

=== Witchcraft accusations ===
Bothwell was arrested on accusations of witchcraft on 15 April 1591. Charged with trying to arrange the king's death through sorcery, he was imprisoned in Edinburgh Castle. These allegations arose through the events of the marriage of James VI to Anne of Denmark in September 1589. She had been expected to sail from Denmark but was prevented by storms three times. The Danish admiral Peder Munk attributed the storms to witchcraft. The same weather caused an accident in the River Forth resulting in the drowning of Jane Kennedy, whom James had appointed to be chief of Anne's ladies-in-waiting. James then asked Bothwell, as Admiral of Scotland, to prepare a fleet to fetch Anne. Bothwell's estimate of the costs involved was high and James decided to raise funds and make the voyage himself.

Bothwell remained in Scotland and was given a share of the government. Subsequently, in November 1590 those accused of witchcraft in North Berwick were tortured and made confessions about causing the storms by magic. The historian Christina Larner proposed that the character of the witch hunt with the "demonic pact" which featured in the confessions was influenced by Danish practice. In July 1590 a number of so-called witches had been arrested in the Copenhagen witch trials in Denmark, including Anna Koldings, for causing the storms. One of the Scottish accused, healer Agnes Sampson, according to James Melville of Halhill, claimed the devil had shown her a picture of James VI saying he should be "consumed at the instance of a noble man Francis Erle Bodowell." Another, magician Ritchie Graham, confessed and insisted he had conspired with the earl, leading to his arrest in April 1591.

=== Outlaw ===
Francis broke out of the castle on 22 June 1591, while the king was away at the wedding of Lilias Murray and John Grant of Freuchie at Tullibardine, and headed south. He was convinced that the Chancellor, John Maitland of Thirlestane, was behind his accusation. He was proclaimed an outlaw three days later. James VI gave his lands and offices and the castles of Crichton and Hailes to the Duke of Lennox. Anne of Denmark tried to intercede for Bothwell, but found the king so "moved", so angry with those who had requested her intervention, that she dropped the issue. Bothwell spent his days at Crichton but hid at night in woods and other places. One of his chief confederates, Archibald Wauchope of Niddrie, abandoned him.

In July 1591 William Hunter sent news to William Cecil of the search for the rebel earl. James VI had gone to Kelso but there was news of Bothwell at Aberdeen. Hunter wrote, "Mirrie companyouns say atte thair wyne that all our trubillis ar bott tryfills to gett moir gowld frome Ingland, and thay seik my Loird Boithwell whear thay knaw he is nott, for Aberdene is neir fowr scoir mylis derrect north frome Edinburgh and Kellso is twenty eight mylis derrect sowth frome Edinburgh" - Merry companions say at their wine that all our troubles are but trifles to get more gold from England, and they seek my Lord Bothwell where they know he is not, for Aberdeen is near four score miles direct north from Edinburgh and Kelso is twenty eight miles direct south from Edinburgh.

An English observer wrote of rumours that Bothwell had practiced with witches in some unlawful matter between him and Anne of Denmark, which had made him odious to the king. Bothwell was thought to be in Leith on 18 October, where his wife was staying, and the king hunted for him there. James Sandilands captured his servant Robert Scott, brother of the Laird of Balwearie and Valentine, the earl's best horse, but the earl could not be found.

On 27 December Bothwell broke into Holyroodhouse attempting to seek reconciliation, or as his opponents claimed, trying to assassinate James and Anne. The twins Patrick and John Schaw were killed trying to defend the king. Some of his supporters were captured, including David Cunningham of Robertland, and some sentenced to death. Anne of Denmark pleaded with James VI for their lives, especially for surgeon John Naysmyth.

Reports of Bothwell at Morham, his mother's tower house, and Coldingham resulted in the king leading a party from Holyroodhouse on 13 January 1592 to apprehend him. However, the King's horse threw him into a pool of water, from which a local yeoman had to rescue him "by the necke", and the chase was abandoned. Early in 1592, Bothwell addressed a letter to the clergy of Edinburgh, indignantly disowning the witchcraft charges. On 7 April the King again went in pursuit of Bothwell, crossing the Forth to travel north, Bothwell having been heard of in Dundee, and the Privy Council of Scotland denounced Ross of Balnagown, the Master of Gray and his brother Robert, and others for assisting Bothwell.

=== Raid of Falkland ===
When the Parliament of Scotland met on 5 June 1592 for the first time after nearly five years and the Privy Council was reconstituted, a proclamation was issued denuding Bothwell of honours, titles and lands. On 28 June, between one and two o'clock in the morning, Bothwell, leading 300 others, attempted to capture Falkland Palace and the king. Forewarned, the king and queen and his immediate courtiers withdrew to the tower and locked it from within. Bothwell gave up and left with the horses from the royal stables. The English border reiver Richie Graham of Brackenhill and his companions sacked the Falkland town, taking horses, clothing and money. On 29 and 30 June proclamations were issued for Bothwell's pursuit and the arrest of his accomplices, including James Scott of Balwearie, Martine of Cardone, and Lumsden of Airdrie.

=== Fugitive ===
Certain Borders lairds were ordered in June to assemble for his pursuit and were joined by the king himself on 6 July. They did not find the fugitive Bothwell and the pursuit was finally abandoned on 7 August, but the Crown obtained possession of all his houses and strengths. Several of Bothwell's supporters were locked up, including the Earl Marischal, Lord Home, Sinclair of Roslin and John Wemyss of Logie.

On 13 July 1592, a new warrant was issued against Bothwell's supporters in the Borders, including Walter Scott of Harden and Dryhope and John Pennycuik of that Ilk. On 14 September, the Privy Council ordered an armed muster to attend the king into Teviotdale in pursuit of Bothwell's supporters. The king left Edinburgh for Dalkeith on 9 October and thereafter proceeded to Jedburgh. However, little or nothing was achieved in the expedition. October saw a new round of Cautions issued by the Privy Council to supposed supporters of Bothwell.

On 20 November 1592, the Countess of Bothwell was forbidden by decree to be in the king's presence and "none allowed to contenance her". A warrant was subsequently issued by the Edinburgh magistrates for her arrest, with numerous other "adherents of Bothwell still lingering about the town". In January 1593 Bothwell was in the north of England where he had a good reception, which much annoyed James VI. James wrote to Queen Elizabeth I on 7 June to ensure Bothwell's return to Scotland. He complained that Bothwell had been seen in public at a race meeting at Carter Moor near Ponteland, boasting of receiving financial support from Elizabeth, and was known to have stayed with William Fenwick at Wallington.

== Forfeiture ==
Lord Bothwell was formally attainted by Act of Parliament, dated 21 July 1593. However, on Tuesday, 24 July, the Earl, helped by Marie Ruthven, Countess of Atholl, smuggled himself into Holyroodhouse and forced himself at last into the king's presence, in his bedchamber. It was said that Bothwell hid behind the tapestry or hangings until the best moment. Soon numerous Bothwell supporters also entered the room. The Provost of Edinburgh, Alexander Home of North Berwick, came to the palace to help, but the king said things were fine. The king accepted Bothwell's protestations of loyalty and an agreement for his pardon was reached. (It received the Royal and other signatures on 14 August). So, just five days after his forfeiture, Bothwell and his accomplices received a blanket Act of Remission and Condonation.

Bothwell rode to Durham on 2 August 1593, meeting Sir William Reed at Berwick-upon-Tweed on the way. He spoke to the Dean of Durham, Tobias Matthew, and described his recent adventure in Holyroodhouse. He said he had 1,000 soldiers in his pay in Edinburgh.

On Friday, 10 August, a formal trial (described by Spottiswoode as "a farce") of Bothwell was entered into on the old witchcraft charges in order to deal with them once and for all. The depositions of Ritchie Graham were read out, that he advised Bothwell to poison the king, or burn his effigy in wax, or enchant the king to stay in Denmark in 1590. Bothwell made speeches and other argument on his own behalf, and blamed his enemies Sir George Home and Sir John Carmichael. He was acquitted. The English ambassador Robert Bowes described how on 15 August 1593 James VI and the Earl of Bothwell enjoyed a particularly Scottish form of banquet involving "small provisions of delicates having spice [sweet]meat and wines, of no great matter or value" at the Shore of Leith before the king embarked in a ferry boat for Kinghorn and Falkland Palace. Bothwell conveyed the queen, Anne of Denmark, to Falkland the next day, and he gave the king two English horses and a dozen hounds.

The King, however, was not yet finished, and when the Convention of Estates met at Stirling on 7 September he conspired with those opposed to Bothwell to recall his pardon and Royal messengers went to meet Bothwell on the 11th, at Linlithgow, with the news that the king proposed to modify his blanket pardon, and added a condition that Bothwell would have to go into exile. He went first to Crichton, then to Jedburgh.

It was thought at first that Bothwell had not taken this badly and would comply, but feeling betrayed he soon returned to his old ways and in the first days of October his partisans, the Earls of Atholl, Montrose, and Gowrie, had been seen in arms in the vicinity of Linlithgow. It is not clear whether Bothwell was with them. A warrant was issued against Bothwell and others on 11 October. Failing to appear, they were denounced rebels on the 25th. Bothwell had gone to Carlisle Castle and was received by Thomas Scrope.

The Privy Council issued a Proclamation for a muster at Stirling for the pursuit of Bothwell on 2 April 1594, following a collision between the King's forces and Bothwell's in the fields between Edinburgh and Leith, near Arthur's Seat, called in some books "The Raid of Leith". There was not much bloodshed, the king remaining at the Burgh Muir, with Bothwell retiring to Dalkeith en route again to the Scottish Borders. Many thought had Bothwell pressed home he would have been the victor and had a warm welcome from the citizens of Edinburgh, as his Protestant cause was gaining popularity.

In April 1594, James VI sent Edward Bruce and James Colville of Easter Wemyss to London to complain about "secret intelligence" which had passed between the ambassador Lord Zouche and the rebel Earl of Bothwell. James VI wrote to the Earl of Essex asking for his support.

In May 1594, Bothwell was in Northumberland and he heard that goldsmith Jacob Kroger had stolen jewels from Anne of Denmark. Bothwell found Kroger at Edward Delaval's house near North Shields and took some of the jewels, hoping to use them to bargain his way back into the king's favour. The Bailiff of Shields prevented him taking Kroger and his companion Guillaume Martyn back to Scotland. Bothwell seems to have spent some time in Scotland, at Hermitage Castle, in these months. In July, John Carey, an English officer at Berwick, heard that Bothwell had entered into a truce, arranged by Anne of Denmark's intercession, until after the baptism of Prince Henry. In August, Joachim von Bassewitz, the ambassador of the Duke of Mecklenburg (who was Anne of Denmark's grandfather), offered to speak with the English ambassador Robert Bowes on Bothwell's behalf, but Bowes declined.

As a result of his poverty and lack of support, Bothwell had no option left to him but to change religious sides. A new Privy Council proclamation against him, dated 30 September 1594, states that he had "thrown off the cloik of religioun" (meaning Presbyterianism) and openly allied himself in a new confederacy against the king with the Roman Catholic Lords Huntly, Angus, Errol, and others. The king proceeded north against them. The confederacy collapsed and Huntly and Errol agreed to go abroad.

== Exile and death ==
The king's pardon being revoked, another formal sentence of treason was proclaimed against Bothwell on 18 February 1595, the day of the execution of his half-brother, Hercules Stewart. Hercules supported his brother, but was captured, along with another person, by John Colville and William Hume, who promised them their lives. However, they were hanged "in spite of much popular sympathy, at the Market Place of Edinburgh."

Until April 1595, Bothwell continued to lurk about Caithness and Orkney but eventually embarked for France, landing at Newhaven in Normandy. On 6 May 1595 Thomas Edmondes reported that Bothwell was in Paris and had reported himself to the king, Henry IV, seeking help. James VI upon hearing this sent a special messenger to Henry IV asking for Bothwell to be banished from France, but the request was declined. After several months Bothwell left for Spain. Between 1598 and 1600 it was rumoured he visited London from Gravelines or Dieppe. James VI heard he was in London with John Colville in August 1598 but did not believe it. Walter Raleigh advised Robert Cecil that Elizabeth should detain Bothwell. Raleigh wrote that Bothwell "will ever be the canker of her estate and safety."

In February 1602, a rumour circulated that he had left Spain for the Low Countries and was trying to bribe Colonel Edmond or Captain William Brog (who were said to be rivals in emulation), with their Scottish soldiers, to join the Spanish service. In June 1602 there was a rumour that Sir George Home and Sir Thomas Erskine wanted to recall him to Scotland to strengthen their faction, and that one of the Bothwell's daughters, who was "a very gallant lady", would marry the young Earl of Morton. These rumours or plans came to nothing. In July 1602 a marriage was contracted for Anna Home, the daughter of Sir George Home, and Sir James Home of Whitrig, Bothwell's nephew, and again it was thought that Bothwell himself might be restored.

Bothwell lived in poverty in Naples, where he died in November 1612. The English ambassador in Venice, Sir Dudley Carleton, reported that Bothwell died at Naples after hearing news of the death of Henry Frederick, Prince of Wales, who he had hoped would restore his fortune. The Spanish Viceroy of Naples, the Count of Lemos, arranged a lavish funeral for the Scottish earl.

== Marriage and family ==
Arms of Francis Stewart, Earl of Bothwell

On 1 December 1577, Francis, Earl of Bothwell, married Margaret Douglas (d. 1640), daughter of the 7th Earl of Angus, and widow of Sir Walter Scott of Branxholme & Buccleuch (d. 1574). Initially, after a brief honeymoon, the new earl was not permitted to come within twenty miles of his new wife "for reassone of his youngnes."

James VI made a proclamation against Margaret Douglas for her support of her husband in November 1592. She was said to be "a griter mellair", to have had more involvement in her husband's treasons, "than became a woman".

They had at least four sons and four daughters:

- Francis Stewart, Lord Bothwell and Commendator of Kelso Abbey (b. 1584). His baptism was celebrated by a banquet in Edinburgh, attended by James VI. After his father's death, in spite of the attainder, he was occasionally styled 'Earl Bothwell', and Lord Stewart and Bothwell. Upon his marriage to Isobel Seton, daughter of the Earl of Winton, he obtained a rehabilitation under the Great Seal of Scotland, 30 July 1614, but reserving the rights of those who had been granted his father's forfeited lands. (The rehabilitation was not formally ratified by Parliament until 1633). In 1630 he was 'absent from the country'. He finally obtained recovery, by decreet arbitral of Charles I, of part of the family estates, which he then sold to the Winton family. He lived in straitened circumstances, in 1637 petitioning King Charles 1st to be made Printer to the King in Ireland for 51 years. When he died his Testament-Dative was given in by his creditors at Edinburgh on 21 April 1640. His eldest son, generally called Charles (b. 1617), fought in the Civil War, but is said to have died in England after the Battle of Worcester in 1651, and on 26 November 1656, his brother Robert was cited as the heir to their father's debts when the barony of Coldingham was acquired by the Home of Renton family. He appears to have died without issue, and their unmarried sister was regarded as the last of the line.
- John (2nd son), the last Commendator of Coldingham Priory and 1st secular feudal Baron of Coldingham. On 16 June 1622 he transferred the barony to his elder brother, Francis. John was still living in April 1636, and apparently into the 1650s, when he is mentioned by Sir John Scott of Scotstarvet in The Staggering State of the Scottish Statesman, but he seems to have been dead by 1656, when a grandson named Francis was described as his heir in the transaction at Coldingham mentioned above. John Stewart had a daughter Margaret who married Sir John Home, Lord Renton, who was the actual beneficiary of the transaction; their descendants are described as the heirs-general of the Earls of Bothwell. John Stewart of Coldingham is also identified as the father of Francis Stewart of Coldingham, "grandson of the Earl of Bothwell", who became a trooper in the Scottish Life Guards after the Restoration, gained a captain's commission in the Scots Greys, and commanded the left wing at the Battle of Bothwell Brig in 1679, and died around 1683. There seems little evidence to confirm this identification, however, and it is possible that this was the cavalryman son of the titular 6th Earl, who is called "Francis" by Scott of Scotstarvet.
- Frederick, (3rd son) (b. 1594) mentioned in the Privy Council Registers in 1612 (vol. ix, p. 498).
- Henry (Harry), (4th son) (b. 1594?) signed many documents with his elder brothers, and who, in 1627, consented to a lease. Possibly twin with Frederick.
- Elizabeth (b. 1590) (eldest daughter) was baptised at Holyroodhouse on 1 March 1590. The English diplomat Robert Bowes gave a gift of a silver ewer and basin worth £100, made in Edinburgh by the silversmith Thomas Foulis, and Bowes also gave rewards to the nurse, midwives, musicians and servants in Bothwell's household. Bowes asked Francis Walsingham to make arrangements for credit in London for these diplomatic gifts. Elizabeth Stewart wife of James Stewart, 2nd Earl of Moray was witness for Queen Elizabeth. In July 1602 it was rumoured she would marry the "young Earl of Morton". She married James, Master of Cranstoun, (who appears to have been banished in 1610); they were the parents of William Cranstoun, 3rd Lord Cranstoun.
- Helen, married John Macfarlane of that Ilk.
- Jean (d. after 1624) married Robert Elliot of Redheugh.
- Margaret, married Alan Cathcart, 5th Lord Cathcart, a son of Alan Cathcart, 4th Lord Cathcart (1537-1618).

== Theatrical depictions ==
Francis Stewart is depicted as a major character in the plays Jamie the Saxt (1936) by Robert McLellan and The Burning (1971) by Stewart Conn. Both plays deal with the period of his conflict, as outlaw and rebel, with King James VI in the early 1590s.

Peerage of Scotland
Preceded by James Hepburn	Earl Bothwell; 1587 – 1612	Forfeit
