= Patrick Hepburn, 3rd Earl of Bothwell =

Scottish admiral (1512–1556)

- Nickname: Fair Earl
- Born: 1512; Kingdom of Scotland
- Died: September 1556 (aged 43–44) Dumfries, Kingdom of Scotland
- Allegiance: Kingdom of Scotland
- Branch: Royal Scots Navy
- Service years: 1531–1556
- Rank: Lord High Admiral of Scotland

Patrick Hepburn, 3rd Earl of Bothwell (1512 – September 1556) was the son of Adam Hepburn, Lord Hailes, who died at the Battle of Flodden the year after Patrick's birth.

Hepburn was known as the Fair Earl. He owed this more to his looks than his character, being described as "fair and white" while a young boy.

He was imprisoned in 1529 for two years for harbouring robbers. Once released he decided to exact revenge by beginning a treasonable correspondence with England. He then spent much of the next years in England, and after James V died following the Battle of Solway Moss, Hepburn signed a pact with Henry VIII promising to serve him and aid the commitment of the then infant Mary, Queen of Scots, into Henry's custody.

Despite having sworn loyalty to Henry VIII, Hepburn was awarded an annual pension of £1,000 from Mary of Guise (Mary, Queen of Scots' mother) in return for his patriotic fidelity. It was said that Hepburn believed there was the possibility of marrying into royalty and that was his reason for divorcing his wife. However, the prospects for royal marriage were thin and despite Henry VIII engaging in another bloody invasion of Scotland, Hepburn resumed correspondence with the English Court. In the intervening years, Hepburn apprehended George Wishart in January 1546, who was put on trial for heresy and executed at St Andrews on 1 March 1546.

In 1548, Hepburn renounced his loyalty to the Scottish crown, and became a pensioner of England, earning 3,000 crowns annually. He went into England in July 1549, staying two nights at Naworth Castle. However, in November 1553 he returned to Scotland after his formal pardon by Mary of Guise. He died at Dumfries.

== Marriage and family ==
In 1534, The Earl of Bothwell married in Agnes Sinclair, daughter of Henry Sinclair, 4th Lord Sinclair (who also fell at Flodden), whereafter she was styled Countess of Bothwell. They were divorced before 16 October 1543, whereafter she styled herself by the Earl's lowest subsidiary title as Lady Morham until her death in 1572. She used a signature "Agnes Lady Moram". Her will was witnessed by the goldsmith James Mosman and others.

They had three children:

- James Hepburn, 4th Earl of Bothwell, his son and heir, who eventually became the third and last husband of Mary, Queen of Scots.
- Jean (Janet) Hepburn (d. before 27 July 1599) whose first husband was John Sinclair, Master of Caithness (d.1578, v.p.), with issue; her second husband was John Stewart, Commendator of Coldingham, by whom she had Francis Stewart, 5th Earl of Bothwell; her third husband the notorious Archibald Douglas, Parson of Douglas, a Senator of the College of Justice, and brother of William Douglas of Whittinghame.

Peerage of Scotland
Preceded by Adam Hepburn	Earl of Bothwell; 1513–1556	Succeeded by James Hepburn
Military offices
Unknown	Lord High Admiral of Scotland; 1544 – ?	Unknown
