= Adam Hepburn, 2nd Earl of Bothwell =

Scottish noble

Adam Hepburn
- Born: c. 1492
- Died: 9 September 1513
- Title: 2nd Earl of Bothwell

Adam Hepburn, 2nd Earl of Bothwell (born c. 1492, died 9 September 1513) was a Scottish nobleman, who succeeded his father Patrick Hepburn, 1st Earl of Bothwell in 1508. Prior to that, he was known by one of his territorial designations, Adam Hepburn of Crags, under which he drew up his Testament.

Hepburn married in 1511 (the first of her four husbands) Agnes (died February 1557), the illegitimate daughter of James Stewart, 1st Earl of Buchan by Margaret Murray. This Agnes Stewart was provided with Letters of Legitimacy, confirmed by Queen Mary of Guise, on 31 October 1552, under the Great Seal of Scotland. Hepburn and Agnes had one child: Patrick. Hepburn was killed at the Battle of Flodden, where he commanded the Scottish reserve.

Political offices
Unknown	Lord High Admiral of Scotland; 1511–1513	Unknown
Peerage of Scotland
Preceded by Patrick Hepburn	Earl of Bothwell; 1508–1513	Succeeded by Patrick Hepburn
