= Earl of Bothwell =

Title in the Peerage of Scotland

Coat of arms of the 4th Earl of Bothwell

Earl of Bothwell was a title that was created twice in the Peerage of Scotland. It was first created for Patrick Hepburn in 1488, and was forfeited in 1567. Subsequently, the earldom was recreated for the 4th Earl's nephew and heir of line, Francis Stewart, whose father was an illegitimate son of James V. The second creation was forfeited in 1612, and although the heir was subsequently rehabilitated, the title was never restored.

The title Duke of Orkney was created in the Peerage of Scotland in 1567 for James Hepburn, 4th Earl of Bothwell, with the subsidiary title Marquess of Fife. All titles were declared forfeit in 1567.

== Earls of Bothwell, first creation (1488) ==
- Patrick Hepburn, 1st Earl of Bothwell (d. 1508)
- Adam Hepburn, 2nd Earl of Bothwell (1492–1513)
- Patrick Hepburn, 3rd Earl of Bothwell (d. 1556)
- James Hepburn, 4th Earl of Bothwell (1535–1578) became Duke of Orkney in 1567

== Duke of Orkney (1567) ==
- James Hepburn, 1st Duke of Orkney (1535–1578) (forfeited all titles in 1567)

== Earls of Bothwell, second creation (1587) ==
- Francis Stewart, 1st (or 5th) Earl of Bothwell (1563–1612)
- Francis Stewart, but for the attainder 2nd (or 6th) Earl of Bothwell (c. 1584–1640)
- Charles Stewart, but for the attainder 3rd (or 7th) Earl of Bothwell (c. 1617–1651)
- Robert Stewart, but for the attainder 4th (or 8th) Earl of Bothwell (fl. 1656)

The next heir appears to have been Captain Francis Stewart of Coldingham, a cavalry officer who commanded the royalist left wing at the Battle of Bothwell Brig in 1679, and who seems to have died around 1683; the male line has not been traced beyond this point.

== See also ==
- Bothwell Castle – briefly occupied by Patrick Hepburn, 1st Earl of Bothwell
- Bothwell – village located near the castle that bears the name
