= James Hepburn, 4th Earl of Bothwell =

Consort of Mary, Queen of Scots in 1567

James Hepburn
- Duke of Orkney; Marquess of Fife; Earl of Bothwell
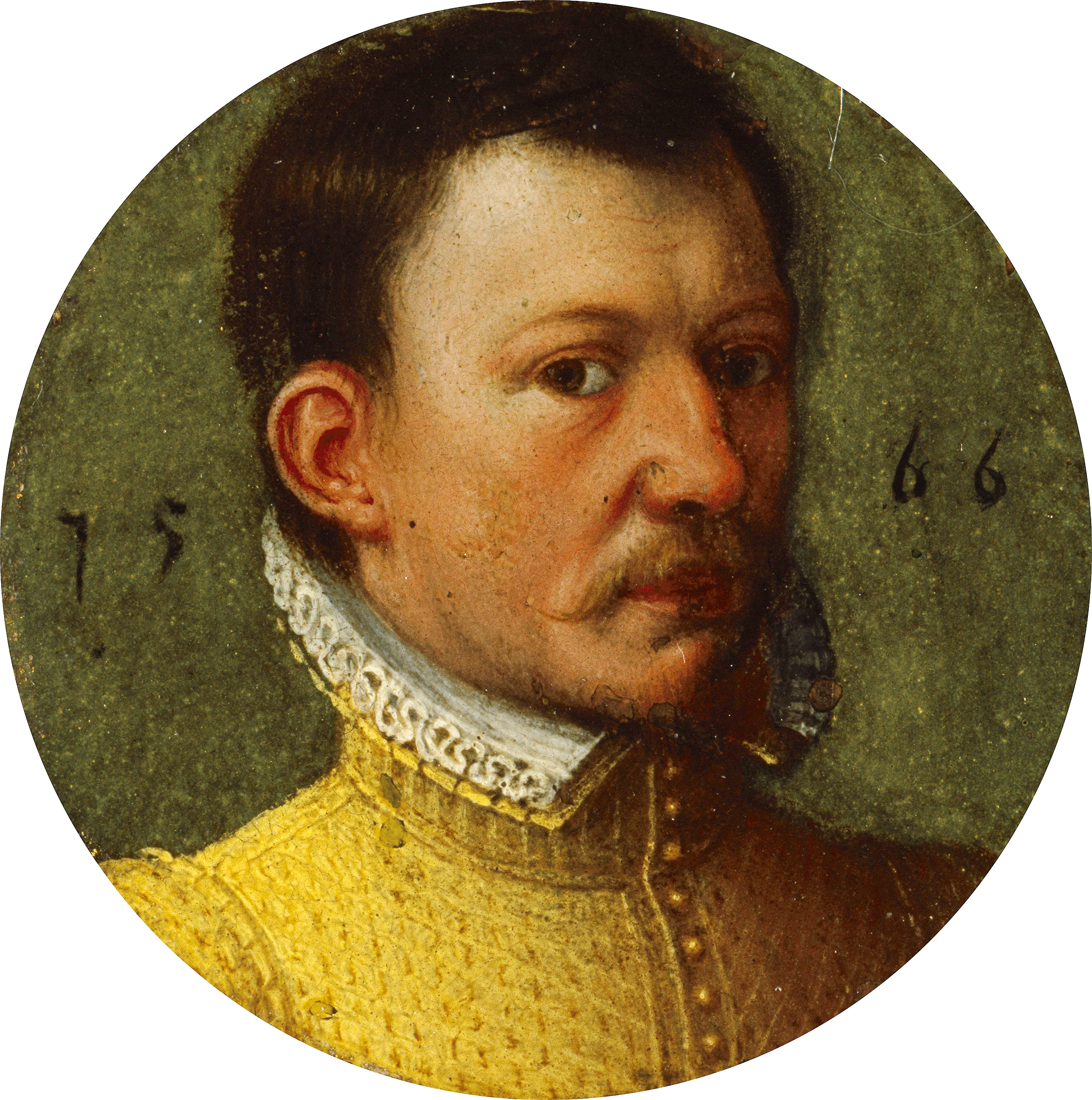
- Lord Bothwell in 1566

Consort of the Scottish monarch
- Tenure: 15 May 1567 – 24 July 1567
- Born: c. 1534; Edinburgh, Scotland
- Died: 14 April 1578 (aged 44); Dragsholm Castle, Denmark
- Burial: Fårevejle Church, Odsherred, Denmark
- Spouses: Anna Throndsen; Lady Jean Gordon (m. 1566; div. 1567) Mary, Queen of Scots (m. 1567)
- Father: Patrick Hepburn, 3rd Earl of Bothwell
- Mother: Agnes Sinclair

James Hepburn, 1st Duke of Orkney and 4th Earl of Bothwell (c. 1534 – 14 April 1578), better known simply as Lord Bothwell, was the third husband of Mary, Queen of Scots. He was accused of the murder of Mary's second husband, Henry Stuart, Lord Darnley, a charge of which he was acquitted. His marriage to Mary was controversial and divided the country; when he fled the growing rebellion to Norway, he was arrested and lived the rest of his life imprisoned in Denmark.

== Early life ==
James Hepburn was the son of Patrick Hepburn, 3rd Earl of Bothwell, and Agnes Sinclair (d. 1572), daughter of Henry, Lord Sinclair, and was styled the Master of Bothwell from birth. He succeeded his father as Earl of Bothwell and Lord Hailes in 1556.

== Anna Throndsen ==
As Lord High Admiral of Scotland, Lord Bothwell visited Copenhagen around 1559. He fell in love with Anna Tronds, known in English as Anna Throndsen or Anna Rustung. She was a Norwegian noblewoman whose father, Kristoffer Trondson, a famous Norwegian admiral, was serving as Danish Royal Consul. After their engagement, or more likely marriage under Norwegian law, Anna left with Bothwell. In Flanders, he said he was out of money and asked Anna to sell all her possessions. She complied and visited her family in Denmark to ask for more money. Anna was unhappy and apparently given to complaining about Bothwell. His treatment of Anna played a part in his eventual downfall.

== Under Mary of Guise's regency ==
Bothwell supported Mary of Guise, queen dowager and Regent of Scotland, against the Protestant Lords of the Congregation. Bothwell and 24 followers took 6000 crowns of English money destined to be used against Guise from the Laird of Ormiston on Halloween 1559 at an ambush near Haddington. In retaliation the Protestant leader, the Duke of Châtelherault, sent his son the Earl of Arran and the Master of Maxwell to seize Bothwell's home Crichton Castle and force the Earl, who was nearby at Borthwick, to join them. Bothwell remained true to the Regent, though it was said in January he was "weary of his part". The English diplomat Thomas Randolph also hinted at this time of a scandal involving his sister Jean Hepburn.

== Meeting Queen Mary in France ==
Lord Bothwell appears to have met Queen Mary when he visited the French Court in the autumn of 1560, after he left Anna Rustung in Flanders. He was kindly received by the Queen and her husband, King Francis II of France, and, as he put it: "The Queen recompensed me more liberally and honourably than I had deserved" – receiving 600 Crowns and the post and salary of gentleman of the French King's Chamber. He visited France again in the spring of 1561, and by 5 July was back in Paris for the third time – this time accompanied by the Bishop of Orkney and the Earl of Eglinton. By August, the widowed Queen was on her way back to Scotland in a French galley, some of the organisation having been dealt with by Bothwell in his naval capacity.

== At Queen Mary's court ==
After Protestant Lords gained power following Mary of Guise's death and the return to Scotland of Mary, Queen of Scots, Bothwell appears to have been not much more than a troublesome noble at court. His open quarrel with the Earl of Arran and the Hamiltons, who accused him of intriguing against the Crown, caused some degree of anguish to the Queen. The Earl of Arran accused Bothwell of plotting to kidnap Mary and the Earl of Moray from the deer park at Falkland Palace at Easter 1562. Although the Earl of Arran was eventually declared mad, Bothwell was nevertheless imprisoned in Edinburgh Castle without trial. Later that year, while the Queen was in the Highlands, Bothwell escaped and went to Hermitage Castle.

The Queen and Bothwell were by now very close. Bothwell married Lady Jean Gordon, daughter of the Earl of Huntly, on 24 February 1566 and Queen Mary attended the wedding at Holyrood. The banquet was held at Kinloch's house on the Canongate. According to Robert Lindsay of Pitscottie there followed five days of jousting and tournaments. The marriage lasted just over a year.

In October 1566, after the birth of Prince James, Queen Mary came to Jedburgh to hold justice courts. Upon hearing that Bothwell had been seriously wounded and was likely to die, Mary rode to be with him at Hermitage Castle. Subsequently, Mary was unwell and resided at Jedburgh until she recovered. Antonia Fraser asserts that Queen Mary was already on her way to visit Bothwell on matters of state before she heard about his illness, and that therefore this visit is not evidence that they were already lovers at the time of his accident. Alison Weir agrees, and in fact the records show that Mary waited a full six days after learning of his injuries before going to visit Bothwell. The story of her mad flight to his side was put about later by her enemies to discredit her.

== Darnley's murder ==
On 9 February 1567 Bothwell left his lodging at Todrick's Wynd on the south side of the Royal Mile in Edinburgh (east of Blackfriars Street) and with accomplices Dalgliesh, Powrie and Wilson, carried several kegs of gunpowder to Kirk o'Field lodging to the south, almost encountering Queen Mary en route. At Kirk O'Field they lit the gunpowder destroying part of the building and killing Darnley and his aide.

Bothwell was publicly accused of having murdered the Queen's consort, Lord Darnley. Darnley's father, the Earl of Lennox, and other relatives agitated for vengeance and the Privy Council began proceedings against Bothwell on 12 April 1567. Sir William Drury reported to Sir William Cecil, Secretary of State to Elizabeth I of England, that the Queen was in continuous ill-health "for the most part either melancholy or sickly". On the appointed day Bothwell rode magnificently down the Canongate, with the Earl of Morton and William Maitland of Lethington flanking him, and his Hepburns trotting behind. The trial lasted from noon till seven in the evening. Bothwell was acquitted and it was widely rumoured that he would marry Mary.

== Abduction of and marriage to Queen Mary ==
Arms of James Hepburn, 1st Duke of Orkney

The next Wednesday, Queen Mary rode to the Estates of Parliament, with Lord Bothwell carrying the Sceptre, where the proceedings of Bothwell's trial were officially declared to be just according to the law of the land. On Saturday 19 April 1567, eight bishops, nine earls, and seven Lords of Parliament put their signatures to what became known as the Ainslie Tavern Bond, a manifesto declaring that Mary should marry a native-born subject, and handed it to Bothwell. Bothwell started divorce proceedings citing his adultery with Jane Gordon's servant Bessie Crawford as a cause.

On 24 April, while Mary was on the road from Linlithgow Palace to Edinburgh, Bothwell suddenly appeared with 800 men. He assured her that danger awaited her in Edinburgh, and told her that he proposed to take her to Dunbar Castle, out of harm's way. She agreed to accompany him and arrived at Dunbar at midnight. There, Mary was taken prisoner by Bothwell and allegedly raped by him to secure marriage to her and the crown (though whether she was his accomplice or his unwilling victim remains a controversial issue). On 12 May the Queen created him Duke of Orkney and Marquess of Fife at Holyrood.

On 15 May they were married in the Great Hall at Holyrood, according to Protestant rites officiated by Adam Bothwell, Bishop of Orkney and John Craig. Some accounts say there was a second Catholic ceremony in the palace chapel. One source for this is known as "Regent Moray's journal", which says they were married "efter baith the sortis of the kirkis, reformit and unreformit". Mary was married in mourning clothes, described as "dule weed". According to William Drury, an English commander at Berwick, there were only a few witnesses who heard a sermon the palace's chamber of presence. The French ambassador, Philibert du Croc did not attend the Duke's creation or the wedding. On the day of the wedding, Mary ordered a gown of black figured velvet embroidered with silver and gold. Mary gave her new husband a fur lined night-gown. There were few festivities until two weeks after the wedding, when there was a triumph and tilt and Bothwell "ran at the ring" at Leith.

The repercussions of the marriage were not long in coming: in Rome, Pope Pius V showed strong displeasure at the marriage between Mary and a Protestant and threatened to excommunicate the Queen. Michele Bonelli, Cardinal Allesandrino and Pope's great-nephew, reported that the Pius was reluctant to communicate with Mary until her behaviour and religious life improved. Eventually, tensions eased, and the Pope abandoned his threat of excommunication against Mary. In 1568-69, she requested to Pope an annulment of her marriage to Bothwell in order to try to marry the Catholic Thomas Howard, 4th Duke of Norfolk.

The marriage divided the country into two camps, and on 16 June, the Lords opposed to Mary and the Duke of Orkney (as Bothwell had newly become) signed a Bond denouncing them. A showdown between the two opposing sides followed at Carberry Hill on 15 June, from which Orkney (as Lord Bothwell was now known) fled, after one final embrace, never to be seen again by Mary. In December that year, Bothwell's titles and estates were forfeited by Act of Parliament.

== Escape to Scandinavia and imprisonment ==
After fleeing the confrontation at Carberry Hill, the Duke of Orkney (as Bothwell was now) went to Huntly Castle and Spynie Palace. He took ship from Aberdeen to Shetland, where he talked to Olave Sinclair at Dunrossness and took the Pelican belonging to Gerdt Hemeling of Bremen. Nicholas Throckmorton described the Pelican as "a great ship of Bremen, laden with fish" which Bothwell intended to arm and make the admiral or flagship of his art of piracy.

Bothwell was pursued by William Kirkcaldy of Grange and William Murray of Tullibardine, who sailed into Bressay Sound near Lerwick. Four of Bothwell's ships in the Sound set sail north to Unst, where Orkney was negotiating with German captains to hire more ships. Kirkcaldy's flagship, the Lion, chased one of Bothwell's ships, and both ships were damaged on a submerged rock. The Duke of Orkney sent his treasure ship to Scalloway, and fought a three-hour-long sea battle off the Port of Unst, where the mast of one of Orkney's ships was shot away. Subsequently, a storm forced the Duke to sail towards Norway.

Orkney may have hoped to reach Denmark and raise an army with the support of Frederick II of Denmark to put Mary back on the throne. He was caught off the coast of Norway (then in a union with Denmark) at Høyevarde lighthouse in Karmsundet without proper papers, and was escorted to the port of Bergen. This was the native home of Anna Throndsen. Anna raised a complaint against Orkney, which was enforced by her powerful family; her cousin Erik Rosenkrantz, a high-level official in Norway, remanded Orkney to the Bergenhus Fortress, while Anna sued him for abandonment and return of her dowry. Bothwell settled with Anna out of court, offering her as restitution one of his ships and promising her an additional annuity which he never was able to pay, as he never regained his freedom. Orkney would have been released, but King Frederick heard that the Scottish government was seeking Orkney for the murder of Darnley, and decided to take him into custody in Denmark.

The Duke of Orkney was sent to Copenhagen, where the Danish monarch, Frederik II, deliberated on his fate. The Duke was sent across Øresund to the fortress and prison Malmøhus Castle. However, as news from both England and Scotland arrived, Frederik eventually understood that Mary never again would become Queen. Without Mary, the King considered him insignificant.

== Death ==
He was imprisoned at Dragsholm Castle, 75 kilometres (47 mi) west of Copenhagen, and was held in what were said to be appalling conditions. Meanwhile, the Parliament of Scotland officially stripped him of all his Scottish titles, including the Dukedom of Orkney, in December 1567. He died in April 1578, and was buried in a vault at Fårevejle Church near the castle.

A pillar to which he was chained for the last ten years of his life can still be seen, with a circular groove in the floor around the pillar.

In 1858, the body was exhumed and declared to be that of Lord Bothwell. It was in a dried condition and was thereafter referred to as "Bothwell's mummy". His extended family tried to get his body sent back to Scotland, but their request has not been granted. The identity of the body has never been conclusively proven.

A body referred to as "Bothwell's mummy" materialised in 1976 in the Edinburgh Wax Museum on the Royal Mile, as the only non-wax exhibit. The guide book claimed it was brought to Scotland in 1858.

== See also ==
- Casket letters
- Gunpowder, Treason & Plot

Vacant Title last held by Henry Stuart, 1st Duke of Albany as King consort	Consort of the Scottish monarch May - June 1567	Vacant Title next held by Anne of Denmark as Queen consort
Peerage of Scotland
Preceded by Patrick Hepburn	Earl of Bothwell; 1556 – 1567	Forfeit
Honorary titles
Preceded by The 3rd Earl of Bothwell	Lord High Admiral of Scotland; 1556–1567	Succeeded by The 4th Earl of Morton
