= Clan Fleming =

Scottish clan

- Crest: A goat's head erased Argent, armed Or
- Motto: Let The Deed Shaw

Profile
- Region: Lanarkshire
- Plant badge: None
- Clan Fleming no longer has a chief, and is an armigerous clan
- Historic seat: Cumbernauld Castle
- Last Chief: Charles Fleming, The 7th Earl of Wigtown
- Died: 1747
Allied clans
Clan Douglas
Rival clans
Clan Tweedie

Clan Fleming is a Lowland Scottish clan and is officially recognized as such by the Lord Lyon King of Arms. However, as the clan does not currently have a chief that is recognized by the Lord Lyon King of Arms it is therefore considered an armigerous clan.

== History ==
=== Origins of the clan ===
The surname Fleming is derived from the French, le Fleming, which indicates that the family originated in Flanders. The heartland of this once powerful medieval county is now in Belgium, with smallers parts in the Netherlands and France. During the latter part of the twelfth century the Flemish were enterprising merchants who traded with England, Scotland and Wales. A distinguished Flemish leader named Baldwin settled with his followers in Biggar, South Lanarkshire under a grant of David I of Scotland. Baldwin became Sheriff of Lanark under Malcolm IV of Scotland and William the Lion and this office appears to have been hereditary for some time.

=== Wars of Scottish Independence ===
In 1296 nine Flemings signed the Ragman Rolls swearing fealty to Edward I of England. However, one of the signatories was Sir Robert Fleming who was one of the first people to join Robert the Bruce after the death of the Comyn in 1306.

In 1342 Sir Malcolm Fleming of Cumbernauld was created Earl of Wigtown by David II of Scotland for helping to keep him safe from Edward Balliol and the English. In 1371 Sir Malcolm's grandson, Thomas Fleming, sold the earldom to Archibald Douglas, Lord of Galloway and this was confirmed by Robert II of Scotland.

=== 15th century ===
Sir Malcolm Fleming of Biggar and Cumbernauld was knighted by Robert III of Scotland. In 1423 he was one of the hostages used for the release of James I of Scotland from the captivity of the English. This Sir Malcolm Fleming was a counsellor and friend of William Douglas, 6th Earl of Douglas and was a member of the party that went to Edinburgh Castle with Douglas, on the invitation Governor Livingstone and Chancellor Crichton in November 1440, where Douglas, his brother David and Fleming were arrested, briefly tried and then beheaded. As a result, his younger son, Sir Robert Fleming, forfeited the lands that had been returned to him by James II of Scotland because his father had died at the faith and peace of His Majesty. Sir Robert Fleming was created a Lord of Parliament before 1460.

=== 16th century ===
Sir Robert's grandson, John Fleming, 2nd Lord Fleming, was appointed as a guardian to James V of Scotland during the king's infancy in July 1515. In 1517 John became Chancellor of Scotland. However while he was out hawking on 1 November 1524, he was assassinated by John Tweedie of Drummelzier (chief of Clan Tweedie) and others. Malcolm Fleming, 3rd Lord Fleming was Great Chamberlain of Scotland and married Lady Janet Stewart, daughter of James IV of Scotland. This Malcolm Fleming was killed at the Battle of Pinkie Cleugh in 1547.

In 1548 James Fleming, 4th Lord Fleming accompanied the young Mary, Queen of Scots to France where she married the heir to the throne. He was Great Chamberlain of Scotland for life and was one of eight commissioners to the royal wedding in 1558. However he died of suspected poisoning two weeks later in Paris.

=== 17th century ===
In 1606 John the sixth Lord Fleming was created Earl of Wigtown.

=== 18th century and Jacobite risings ===
The Clan Fleming were Jacobites and the 6th earl attended James II of England and VII of Scotland after the Glorious Revolution of 1688. Fleming opposed the Treaty of Union and voted against every article in the Parliament of 1706. During the Jacobite rising of 1715 he was arrested by the governor of Edinburgh Castle. Charles Fleming had succeeded his brother as the earl but when he died in 1747 the title became dormant.

=== Modern history ===
According to the Collins Scottish Clan and Family Encyclopedia, Alexander Fleming who discovered Penicillin is the most distinguished bearer of the name in recent times.

Another famous member was Ian Fleming, best known as the author of the James Bond books, and a well known high society clubman, with homes in Oxfordshire, Chelsea and Jamaica.

== Clan castles ==
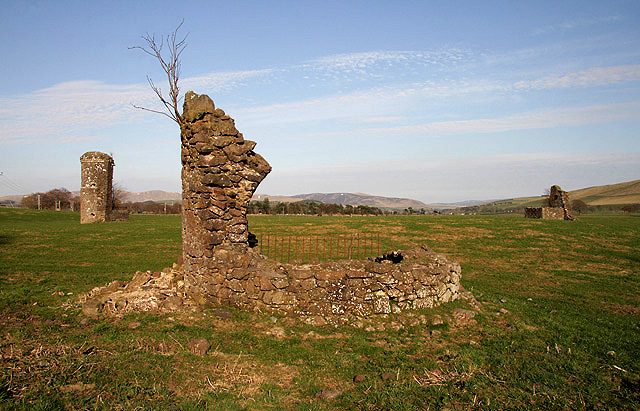
The ruins of Boghall Castle

Castles that have been owned by the Clan Fleming include amongst many others:

- Biggar Castle, which was on the High Street of Biggar, South Lanarkshire was once a strong castle that dates from the thirteenth century. Nothing now survives of the castle which was long held by the Flemings who were descended from Baldwin of Biggar. They moved to Boghall Castle in the fourteenth century.
- Boghall Castle, on the south side of Biggar, Lanarkshire, mostly dates from the sixteenth century although there was an older stronghold on the site. Two D-shaped towers survive but the rest is ruinous. Edward II of England stayed at Boghall in 1310.
- Cumbernauld Castle in Cumbernauld, central Scotland, was a strong castle, most of which is now gone apart from the vaulted chambers and some other fragments that are built into Cumbernauld House. The castle was originally held by the Clan Comyn but passed to the Flemings in 1306. Mary, Queen of Scots visited the castle and the National Covenant was signed there in 1646. The castle was burned in 1746 by government dragoons during the Jacobite rising of 1745.
