= Drinksilver =

Drinksilver was a kind of tip or gratuity given to artisans in Early Modern Scotland, a sum of money suitable for buying drinks and celebrating. Records of payments give insights into labour, service, and patronage.

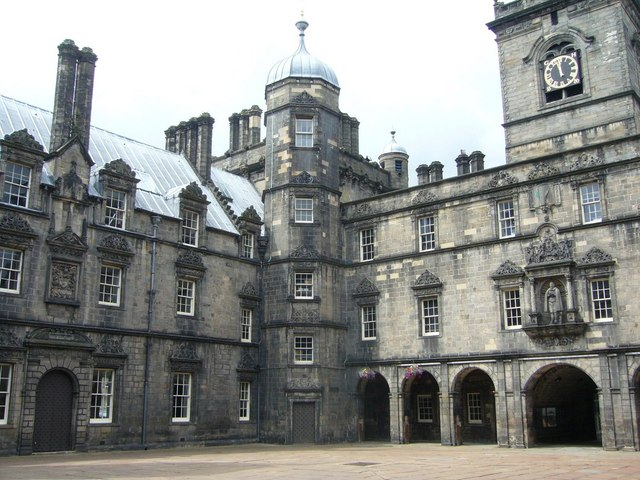
Construction workers at George Heriot's Hospital in Edinburgh in the 1620s and 1630s received drinksilver payments as the project progressed

== Payments and contexts ==
Building accounts written in Latin use the word bibalia for these payments for drinks. An account for building a bridge over the River Tay mentions bibalia given to two blacksmiths Alastair and Andrew Smith and their workers. The Scottish royal accounts have numerous references to gifts of money described as "drinksilver". The money was given to construction workers, artillery-men, tailors, and other makers. The gifts were made during royal visits or at the completion of a phase of work. Mary of Guelders gave 20 shillings to masons at the College of St Salvator at the University of St Andrews in 1461.

James IV gave masons working at Linlithgow Palace in September 1491 drinksilver at the "pending" of three stone vaults. The completion of arched vaulting was a significant milestone in a construction project. In November 1497 he gave masons at Linlithgow a tip of 9 shillings. Following a visit to Whitekirk, on 19 October 1507 James IV went to Hailes Castle and gave drinksilver to masons working on the building. James IV also gave drinksilver to masons working on his tomb at Cambuskenneth Abbey. Regent Arran gave drinksilver to masons laying the foundation of his palace at Kinneil.

Regent Arran gave drinksilver to the tailor of Mary of Guise who made the wedding clothes of his daughter Barbara in January 1548. In September 1561 drinksilver was given to the tailor "boys" who had worked making black mourning "dule" riding clothes for Mary, Queen of Scots, and her ladies to wear at her Entry to Edinburgh. She also gave drinksilver to the servant workmen of the goldsmith James Mosman who made gold chains for her to present to diplomats and her departing French escorts. In November 1569, Regent Moray gave soldiers commanded by James Cunningham 20 shillings in drinksilver for confiscating the goods of Lord Fleming at Boghall Castle at Biggar. Regent Morton gave drinksilver to the workers making gabions at the 'lang siege' of Edinburgh Castle.

In May 1578, James VI gave or sent drinksilver to tailors in the workshop of James Inglis. Gifts were made to junior craftsmen or apprentices, some of whom were called "childer". The childer of a carpenter were given drinksilver in 1598 when they fitted out a nursery for Anne of Denmark at Dalkeith Palace. Accounts consistently record drinksilver gifts to junior craftsmen or junior royal servants, in 1594 at the time of the baptism of Prince Henry, the Edinburgh guild gave drinksilver to a "young man, servant to the king's wardrobe" who supplied cushions for the use of visiting ambassadors. At Stirling Castle, in August 1594, James VI distributed drinksilver of 11 gold rose nobles and 3 crowns of the sun to workmen involved in the baptism preparations.

The accounts of the purse of James V include many gratuities given to servants, especially to those who brought food gifts. However, the only rewards from the king's purse recorded as "drinksilver" were made to the servants of his tailor and shoe maker in March 1540 who delivered goods to him at Stirling Castle. In November 1545, Regent Arran gave drinksilver rewards to three "extraordinary" gunners (meaning they were not on the regular payroll) at the siege of Lochmaben Castle. They also received a month's wage of £9. When James VI visited Halidon Hill near Berwick-upon-Tweed on 27 April 1588, he gave the English commanding officers of the garrison a gift of 100 gold crowns and to the porters (officers of lesser rank) 40 crowns described as drinksilver. In Denmark in 1590, James VI gave 12 gold rose nobles as drinksilver to a man who brought a gift of horses from his soon-to-be brother-in-law, the Duke of Brunswick-Lüneburg.

Drinksilver gifts were also recorded in the household books of aristocrats. In July 1575 Agnes Keith gave 3 shillings to the "boys" (junior craftsmen) who worked for a bow maker and blacksmith in Edinburgh supplying arms to her husband Colin Campbell, 6th Earl of Argyll. In 1619 Jane Drummond gave a gunmaker in Dundee £3 Scots in drinksilver when he was making pistols for her husband the Earl of Roxburghe, even though the Constable of Dundee had commissioned them as a gift.

Masons working on the building of George Heriot's School in the 1620s were given drinksilver at the laying of the foundations, the start of work on the first stairwell or turnpike, and the completing of an entablature or "ledgement" around the building. The masons and barrowmen on the project also received drinksilver on quarter days through the year.

Lawyers's clerks received drinksilver after consultations or on completion of drafting work. Junior clerical workers at the Scottish exchequer received drinksilver. Clerks and officers issuing royal charters under the Great Seal of Scotland were forbidden in 1597 from requesting drinksilver, but could accept it when offered by the clients or parties. The amount of drinksilver to be given to the "man" or under-clerk working for the town clerk of Glasgow by those requesting copies of property records was regulated from 1640. Plague-cleansers working in Stirling in January 1646 charged for disinfecting pairs of plaids and other textiles, at rates fixed by the burgh council "and no further to be taken, nor yet any drink silver".

In 1590, Scottish diplomats offered drinksilver to town officials in The Hague who brought them notice of a gift of wine, but they refused the money saying they would lose their jobs. John Skene observed that the customs of gift giving and gratuities differed "contrair the fashion" in other countries.

== Bounty payments ==
Another kind of payment found in Scottish records is a bounty or "bounteth". Bounties include payments made or promised to new domestic servants when they were hired, made in addition to their yearly fees. Unpaid servant's bounties are frequently recorded as debts in wills. Notionally, such bounties may have been the cash equivalent of shoes and linen for aprons and formed part of a contract between employer and servant. Such bounty payments were akin to livery payments made to royal servants. Master masons received bounty payments, including John Burnhill, who had worked on the tower of Holyrood Palace and at Falkland. In December 1540 he was given money "for his bounteth, and to buy him clothes, because he got never none of before".
