= Janet Stewart, Lady Fleming =

Scottish governess (1502–1562)

- Lady Fleming
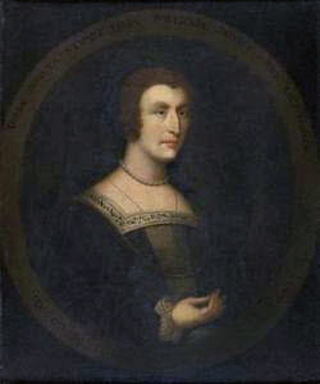
- Portrait of Lady Janet Stewart by George Jamesone
- Full name: Janet Stewart
- Born: 17 July 1502
- Died: 20 February 1562 (aged 59)
- Noble family: House of Stuart
- Spouse: Malcolm Fleming, 3rd Lord Fleming
- Issue: Johanna Fleming; Janet Fleming; Margaret Fleming, Countess of Atholl; James Fleming, 4th Lord Fleming; Elizabeth Fleming; John Fleming, 5th Lord Fleming; Agnes Fleming; Mary Fleming; Henri d'Angoulême
- Father: James IV of Scotland
- Mother: Isabel Stewart

Janet Stewart, Lady Fleming (17 July 1502 – 20 February 1562), called la Belle Écossaise (French for 'the Beautiful Scotswoman'), was a Scottish courtier. She was an illegitimate daughter of King James IV of Scotland who served as governess to her half-niece Mary, Queen of Scots. Janet was briefly a mistress of King Henry II of France, by whom she had a legitimated son: Henri d'Angoulême. Her daughter, Mary Fleming, was one of the young queen's "Four Marys".

== Family ==
Janet Stewart (also referred to as Jane, Jenny, and other variants) was the fifth illegitimate child of the Stewart king James IV to reach adulthood. Her half-brothers included James Stewart, 1st Earl of Moray; Alexander Stewart, Lord Chancellor of Scotland; and James V, King of Scots, her father's only surviving legitimate child.

Her mother was Isabel Stewart, daughter of James Stewart, 1st Earl of Buchan (who bore the nickname "Hearty James").

== Marriage and issue ==
Janet Stewart married Malcolm Fleming, 3rd Lord Fleming, despite being related within a forbidden degree of affinity. They had eight children:

- Johanna (born 1525), who was first married to John, Master of Livingston, killed at the battle of Pinkie 1547, eldest son of Alexander Livingston, 5th Lord Livingston. She married secondly John Sandilands of Caldeer, and thirdly, David Crawford of Kerse.
- Janet (born 1527), who married Richard Brown.
- Margaret Fleming (born by 1532), who married Robert Graham, Master of Montrose, by whom she had a son, John Graham, 3rd Earl of Montrose; then was remarried to Thomas Erskine, Master of Erskine (younger brother of John Erskine, 6th Lord Erskine); and thirdly, married John Stewart, 4th Earl of Atholl, by whom she had a son John Stewart, 5th Earl of Atholl, and three daughters. Margaret Fleming was said to be a witch possessing the power to cast spells to ease the pain of childbirth.
- James Fleming, 4th Lord Fleming (born c. 1534), who married Barbara Hamilton, his daughter Jean Fleming (1554–1609) married John Maitland of Thirlestane, the younger brother of William Maitland of Lethington, the husband of his sister Mary Fleming. His grandson was John Maitland, 1st Earl of Lauderdale.
- Elizabeth (born 1530), who married William, Lord Sanquhar, and was the mother of Robert Crichton, 6th Lord Crichton of Sanquhar.
- John Fleming, 5th Lord Fleming (born c. 1535).
- Agnes (born 1535), who married William Livingstone, 6th Lord Livingston.
- Mary Fleming (born 1543), was one of the "Four Marys", the ladies in waiting to Mary, Queen of Scots. She married William Maitland of Lethington and secondly, George Meldrum of Fyvie.

== Court life ==
Lord Fleming was killed at the Battle of Pinkie in 1547. The following year, presumably due to her unofficial membership in the royal Stewart family, the widow Fleming was appointed governess or nurse to her infant half-niece Mary, Queen of Scots (her new mistress having been fathered by her late half-brother). Her own daughter, Mary Fleming, also joined the queen's household as a lady-in-waiting or fille d'honneur.

In August 1548, mother and daughter accompanied the young queen to France. They waited aboard ship on the Clyde at Dumbarton Castle for a time. Lady Fleming asked Captain Villegaignon if the queen could go back ashore to rest. Villegaignon swore she would go to France or drown on the way.

Giovanni Ferrerio wrote to Robert Reid, Bishop of Orkney, concerned about Lady Fleming's lack of French or Latin. As she was only fluent in Scots, he doubted her ability to communicate to French doctors any symptoms of illness seen in Mary. He hoped Reid would speak to Mary of Guise to secure the appointment of a Scottish physician, William Bog.

Building accounts mention ironwork for the security of the governess's chamber at the Château de Saint-Germain-en-Laye. At the royal court of France, Lady Fleming soon attracted the attentions of King Henry II and became his lover. Their affair resulted in pregnancy and a son was born early in 1551. The affair angered the queen of France Catherine de' Medici and the King's mistress Diane de Poitiers. In October 1551, Janet was sent back to Scotland and replaced as governess to Mary by Françoise de Paroy.

Her son by Henry II, Henri de Valois-Angoulême (1551–June, 1586), became "the chief and most highly favored natural son of the King". He was legitimized and went on to become the "Grand Prior of France, Governor of Provence, and Admiral of the Levantine Sea."

In November 1549 the English prisoner James Wilford was exchanged for the release of her son James, Lord Fleming, who had been captured during the war of the Rough Wooing. In October 1552, Janet's situation in Scotland was described by Mary of Guise in a letter written to her brother, the Cardinal of Lorraine. There had been talk of marrying Janet off to Henri Cleutin, Guise's military advisor. Although one of Janet's daughters had informed Mary of Guise that her mother did not wish to leave Scotland, Guise knew that Janet had discussed leaving Scotland with the Governor, Regent Arran, and wanted to see Henry II that winter. Guise told the Cardinal to reassure Catherine de' Medici that Janet would not be leaving Scotland.

Janet was one of the ladies who kept vigil over the body of Mary of Guise at Edinburgh Castle in June 1560. The ladies were not at first given mourning clothes, and Janet quoted in Latin a phrase from the Book of Joel to the English diplomat Thomas Randolph, "Scindite corda vestra, non vestimenta," Rend your heart, not your garments. Afterwards, Janet applied to the Privy Council for permission to leave Scotland with her son "Lord Hary de Valoys" on 22 August 1560. Henri took part in the St. Bartholomew's Day massacre and was killed in a duel in 1586.

== Ancestors ==
Ancestors of Janet Stewart, Lady Fleming

16. James I of Scotland
8. James II of Scotland
17. Joan Beaufort (= 13)
4. James III of Scotland
18. Arnold, Duke of Gelderland
9. Mary of Guelders
19. Catherine of Cleves
2. James IV of Scotland
20. Dietrich, Count of Oldenburg
10. Christian I of Denmark
21. Hedvig of Holstein
5. Margaret of Denmark
22. John, Margrave of Brandenburg-Kulmbach
11. Dorothea of Brandenburg
23. Barbara of Saxe-Wittenberg
1. Janet Stewart, Lady Fleming
24. Sir John Stewart, of Innermeath
12. James Stewart, the Black Knight of Lorn
25. Isabel MacDougall of Ergadia
6. James Stewart, 1st Earl of Buchan
26. John Beaufort, 1st Earl of Somerset
13. Joan Beaufort
27. Margaret Holland
3. Isabel Stewart
7. Margaret Murray

== Sources ==
- Riddell, John (1843). Stewartiana at Google Books. Edinburgh.
- Weir, Alison (2004). Mary, Queen of Scots, and the Murder of Lord Darnley at Google Books. New York: Random House Trade Paperbacks.
