= Barbara Hamilton (courtier) =

Scottish courtier

Barbara Hamilton (died 1577) was a Scottish courtier.

Barbara Hamilton was the eldest daughter of James Hamilton, Earl of Arran and Margaret Douglas. Her father was the Regent of Scotland from 1543 to 1554.

== Career ==
Barbara Hamilton, accompanied by her gentlewoman servant, joined the royal household of Mary of Guise and Mary, Queen of Scots at Stirling Castle in February 1544. In August 1548, when she was around fifteen years old she rejoined the household of Mary of Guise. French records of the household name her as "Mademoiselle d'Arrane". Barbara had a servant or governess with her in Guise's household called "Male" or "Miel Stuart", and "Marioun Stewart" was also named in this role.

At this time, Barbara was bought a fine black velvet gown with a hood, and a black taffeta gown and crimson sleeves. Her servant were given new clothes, David Pook, her sumpter man or groom, was dressed in grey and Jonet Kelly had a gown of Paris black. They joined the royal household at Falkland Palace. Barbara's clothes and safeguard riding skirts were made by John Anderson and the Queen's tailor.

There was a plague scare at the Scottish court so for a time she lodged with three other gentlewomen, their servants, and a cook and a laundress in Alexander Guthrie's house in the Castlehill of Edinburgh. In November 1548, they moved to stay with the wife of James Thornton.

== Lady Gordon and Huntly Castle ==
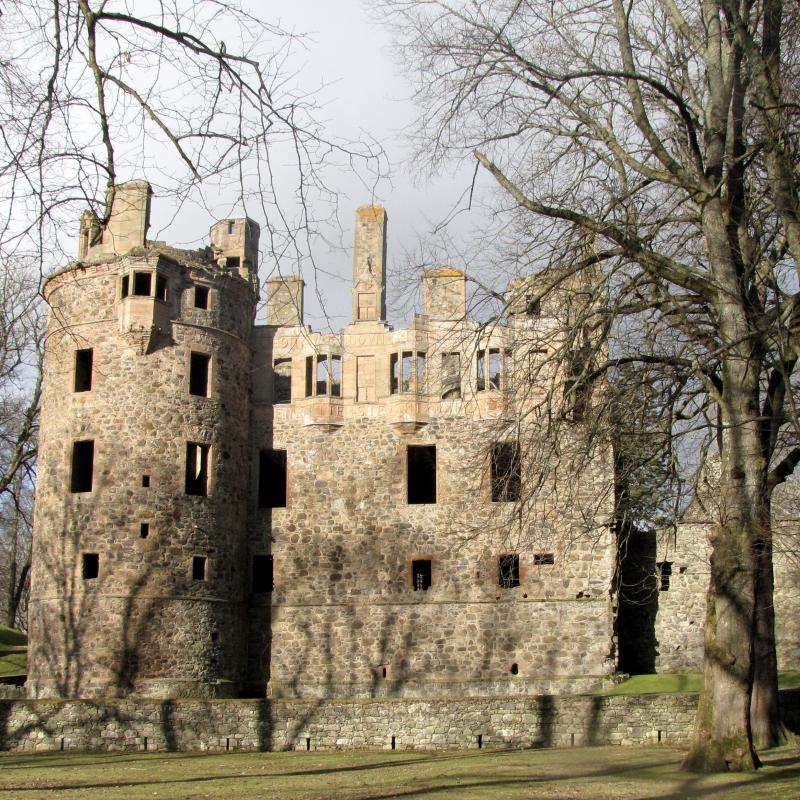
Huntly Castle formerly called Strathbogie

She married Alexander Gordon, Lord Gordon eldest son of George Gordon, 4th Earl of Huntly and Elizabeth Keith on 3 February 1549. When they were betrothed her father appointed a French man, Jacobus Narratius, to be their tutor.

Her wedding dress was described as a "rob ryall" made of purple velvet costing £43 Scots and side-tailed gown of tanny velvet. Mary of Guise inspected the "robe royal" and requested the lining be replaced with better quality taffeta supplied by James Barroun. Barbara Hamilton wore a farthingale or possibly a safeguard, recorded as a "wairdegairt". Regent Arran's lodging was decorated with royal tapestry taken out of storage in Edinburgh Castle by Malcolm Gourlay. The roof of the hall was painted by Walter Binning. A temporary kitchen was built of deal boards. Gold rings, hat-badges, and bracelets were bought for her guests, costing £156. Music at the wedding was provided by four Dutch drummers, four trumpeters, the Queen's violers, and a fiddler. At the wedding there was play or pageant written by William Lauder. She went north to Huntly Castle in March 1550.

She lived at Huntly Castle but seems to have returned to Hamilton and Linlithgow often during her father's regency, and was bought a hat in November 1550. She had her washing done, and sewed collars and ruffs for her father. After a period of illness in November 1550 she was bought a red petticoat, and according to the English physician Andrew Boorde, who had worked for her father, red clothes provided health benefits.

In January 1552 she was at Regent Arran's lodging in Linlithgow and the Queen's tailor measured her for clothes. She was bought a gittern. Her servant Elspeth Douglas stayed in Edinburgh supervising the making of her clothes. Clothes were also made for her sister Anne Hamilton who was set to join the household of Mary of Guise. The goldsmith John Mosman made chains and "target" hat-badges for their father, and he had probably made the jewellery for Barbara's wedding in 1549. She returned to the north and Huntly Castle on 10 February.

Red stemming of Milan was sent to her in May 1552 for an undergown called "wylicoat", with black velvet for a hood. She gave a purple satin gown to her mother-in-law, Elizabeth Gordon, Countess of Huntly and purple taffeta was sent to Huntly to line it. Her servant Elspeth Douglas at Huntly was given a gown of black damask.

In December 1552 she was sent mourning clothes of French black furred with miniver, called a "dule" gown, with linen for "dule" head cloths or kerchiefs. The occasion for mourning is unclear. She was in Linlithgow and again given "dule" clothes in April 1553, presumably for the death of her husband.

In May 1553 she was at court at Stirling Castle. Barbara travelled with Mary of Guise to the west of Scotland in October 1553, accompanied by her servant John Hamilton of Bothwell. Her sister Anne Hamilton also joined this progress to Glasgow and Whithorn. A Scottish russet gown was made for one of her maidens.

== Lady Fleming and Boghall ==
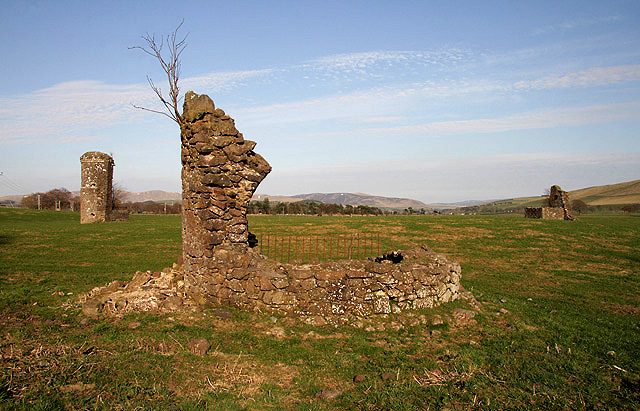
Boghall Castle, near Biggar

Later in 1553 she married her second husband James Fleming, 4th Lord Fleming (d. 1558). He was given a marriage portion of 4000 merks in July 1555. Their children included:

- Jean Fleming, who married (1) John Maitland, 1st Lord Maitland of Thirlestane, and (2) John Kennedy, 5th Earl of Cassilis

According to Nicol Burne, writing in 1581, in 1561 John Knox aspired to marry Barbara Hamilton for her royal connections. Her refusal was said to have caused a rift between Knox and the Hamilton family.

She was mentioned in a charter of 1562.

Barbara Hamilton died in August 1577 at Boghall Castle near Biggar.

According to her will, some of her jewellery was in a coffer at the Place of Kilsyth, including a necklace of blue beads set with gold and pearl, back and fore garnishings for her hair, and fifteen gold horns or points. Some of these jewels were pledged for debts, as was a gold "tablet" or locket set with nine diamonds and a ruby with a pendant pearl, a gold bracelet with nine rubies, and another tablet which opened with leaves on which the inscription "Obsecro Te Sancta Maria Mater Dei Amen" was engraved and highlighted with white enamel. She had also pledged a gown of cloth of gold furred with spotted ermine. She left her daily wearing clothes and two feather beds to her servant Elspeth or Elizabeth Binning. She discouraged her daughter from marrying the Laird of Calderwood. James Maxwell of Calderwood married Isobel Hamilton instead, a daughter of Alexander Hamilton of Innerwick.

Very little is known of Barbara Hamilton in her widowhood during the personal reign of Mary, Queen of Scots and the Marian Civil War in which the Fleming family took the queen's part and her brother-in-law held Dumbarton Castle. The debts mentioned in her will may possibly be connected with the civil war. Regent Lennox made life difficult for the family at Boghall and Cumbernauld Castle.

An inventory of goods at Boghall Castle was made in October 1578 after the death of Elizabeth Ross, Lady Fleming the wife of Barbara Hamilton's brother-in-law John Fleming, 5th Lord Fleming. Their marriage had been celebrated in 1562 with a spectacular theatrical event in Holyrood Park.
