= Lord of Cumbernauld =

Title in the Baronage of Scotland

Lord of Cumbernauld or Baron of Cumbernauld is a title of nobility in the Baronage of Scotland. The caput baronium for this title was originally located at Cumbernauld Castle in North Lanarkshire, Scotland.

The Comyn family held this title for a period of time, but it was eventually forfeited. In 1314, the title was then granted to the Fleming family.
