= Malcolm Fleming, 3rd Lord Fleming =

Lord Chamberlain of Scotland to King James V

Malcolm Fleming, 3rd Lord Fleming (c. 1494 – 10 September 1547), was Lord Chamberlain of Scotland to King James V, from 1524.

== Early life ==
He was the son and heir of John Fleming, 2nd Lord Fleming, who was killed in a feud with the Clan Tweedie of Drumelzier in 1524, with his first wife, Eupheme Drummond, daughter of John Drummond, 1st Lord Drummond.

== Prisoner ==
In November 1542, he was taken prisoner by the English at the Battle of Solway Moss, but released at a ransom of 1,000 marks, paid on 1 July 1548. During the Regency of the Earl of Arran he took messages from Mary of Guise to the English ambassador Ralph Sadler. He was also happy to receive English messengers at his home at Cumbernauld Castle in 1544.

== Personal life ==
Fleming's principal house was Boghall at Biggar, where he founded the collegiate church in 1545. The Tweedie family had already endowed a chaplain there in 1531 as part of the resolution of the feud.

Malcolm married Janet Stewart, illegitimate daughter of King James IV of Scotland, after being granted a dispensation on 26 February 1524/5. Their children included:

- James Fleming, 4th Lord Fleming (died 1558), who married Barbara Hamilton
- John Fleming, 5th Lord Fleming
- Joanna Fleming, who first married John Livingston, Master of Livingston and eldest son of Alexander Livingston, 5th Lord Livingston, who was killed at the Battle of Pinkie prior to his father's death in France. Sometime after 24 May 1560, she married John Sandilands of Calder, who died in May 1567, with whom she had issue. Before November 1567, she married for the third time to David Craufurd of Kerse.
- Janet Fleming, who married Richard Brown, Younger of Hartree, who died after 23 September 1536. Their son and heir apparent was Andrew Brown of Hartree
- Elizabeth Fleming (died after 1550), who married before 24 March 1540/1 William Crichton, 5th Lord Crichton of Sanquhar, and had issue including Robert Crichton, 6th Lord Crichton of Sanquhar
- Agnes Fleming (died before 18 October 1597), who married before 1 October 1553, William Livingstone, 6th Lord Livingston, and had issue
- Margaret Fleming (died before 15 Mar 1586/7), who married Robert Graham, Master of Montrose, who died at the Battle of Pinkie, and had issue, John Graham, 3rd Earl of Montrose. Sometime after 30 Jan 1548/9, she married Thomas Erskine, Master of Erskine, a son of John Erskine, 5th Lord Erskine. On 1 April 1557, she married for the third time to John Stewart, 4th Earl of Atholl.
- Mary Fleming, a Lady-in-Waiting to Mary, Queen of Scots, who married Mary's secretary, William Maitland of Lethington. After his death, she married George Meldrum of Fyvie.

He also had illegitimate sons with an unknown mother:

- John Fleming
- William Fleming

== Death ==
He died on 10 September 1547, aged 53, at the Battle of Pinkie. He had made a will on 15 February 1547. He mentioned £500 owed to him by Mary of Guise, and he wished to be buried in his new church and his father's remains to be taken there from Boghall. He bequeathed the furnishings of Cumbernauld Castle to his eldest son, James Fleming. His wife was to have Boghall excepting its artillery. Lord Fleming asked that his master of work and master complete the church at Biggar. He entrusted his two daughters to continue as companions of Mary, Queen of Scots, and his younger son to be a companion of Mary of Guise's son the Duke of Longueville in France.

Peerage of Scotland
Preceded by John Fleming	Lords Fleming; 1524 – 1547	Succeeded by James Fleming
