= Malcolm Fleming, 1st Lord Fleming =

Malcolm Fleming, 1st Lord Fleming (c. 1437 – c. 1477).

Malcolm Fleming of Monycabow, later the 1st Lord Fleming and the elder son of his family, served as one of the commissioners appointed on 18 October 1474 to negotiate the proposed marriage between James, Prince of Scotland, and Cecilia, daughter of King Edward IV. Malcolm predeceased his father. He married Eupheme, daughter of James, Lord Livingston, and they had two sons and two daughters. Their elder son, Sir David, also died during his grandfather's lifetime.

He was the son of Robert Fleming and Janet Douglas, daughter of James, 7th Earl of Douglas. His son was John Fleming, 2nd Lord Fleming.

Peerage of Scotland
New creation	Lord Fleming; 1451–1477	Succeeded by John Fleming
