= La Belle Châteauneuf =

Mistress of French king Henry III

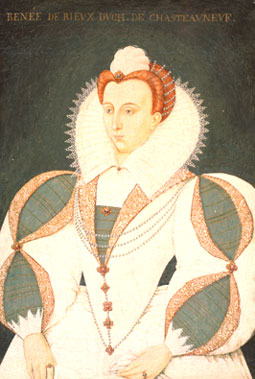
La Belle Châteauneuf

"La Belle Châteauneuf" (fl. 16th C.) was the name popularly given to Renée de Rieux, daughter of Jean de Rieux, seigneur de Châteauneuf, who was descended from one of the greatest families of Brittany. The dates of her birth and death are unknown.

== Relationship with the duke of Anjou and failed match-making ==
She was maid of honour to France's queen mother, Catherine de' Medici, and a member of her notorious "Flying Squadron" (L'escadron volant). She inspired an ardent passion in the duke of Anjou, brother of Charles IX. This intrigue deterred the duke from agreeing to an arranged marriage with Elizabeth I of England; but he soon abandoned la Châteauneuf for Marie of Cleves (1571). The court then wished to find a husband for her, whose singular beauty gave her an influence which the queen-mother feared, and matches were in turn suggested with Stephen Báthory, Voivode of Transylvania, with Robert Dudley, 1st Earl of Leicester; with Antoine Duprat, provost of Paris; and with Charles II de Luxembourg, the Count of Brienne, all of which came to nothing.

== Exile and marriages ==
Ultimately, Renée was banished from the court on the ground that she had been lacking in respect toward the queen, Louise of Lorraine. She married a Florentine named Antinotti, whom she stabbed in a fit of jealousy (1577). She remarried, her husband being Philip Altoviti, who in 1586 was killed in a duel by the Grand Prior Henri d'Angoulême, who was himself mortally wounded.

== Sources ==
- Kelly, Blanche M. (1913). "Francois Malherbe". In Herbermann, Charles George; Pace, Edward Aloysius (eds.). The Catholic Encyclopedia. Vol. 9. The Encyclopedia Press, Inc.
- Potter, David (1990). "Marriage and Cruelty among the Protestant Nobility in Sixteenth-Century France: Diane de Barbançon and Jean de Rohan, 1561-7". European History Quarterly. 20 (January 1): 5–38. doi:10.1177/026569149002000101. S2CID 144245625.
- Christiaens, Daniel; Chichkine, Vladimir (2019). "Une figure de l'escadron volant : Renée de Rieux, la baronne de Castellane". Proslogion (in French). 5 (1): 144–156. doi:10.24411/2500-0926-2019-00009.
