= Cumbernauld Castle =

Castle in North Lanarkshire, Scotland

- Cumbernauld, North Lanarkshire, Scotland
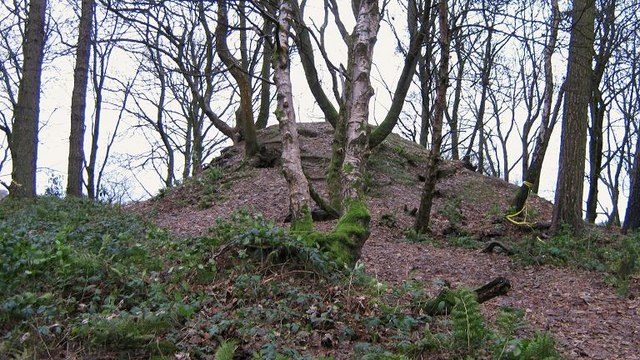
- The Comyn Motte at Cumbernauld Park

Site information
- Condition: Ruined

Location
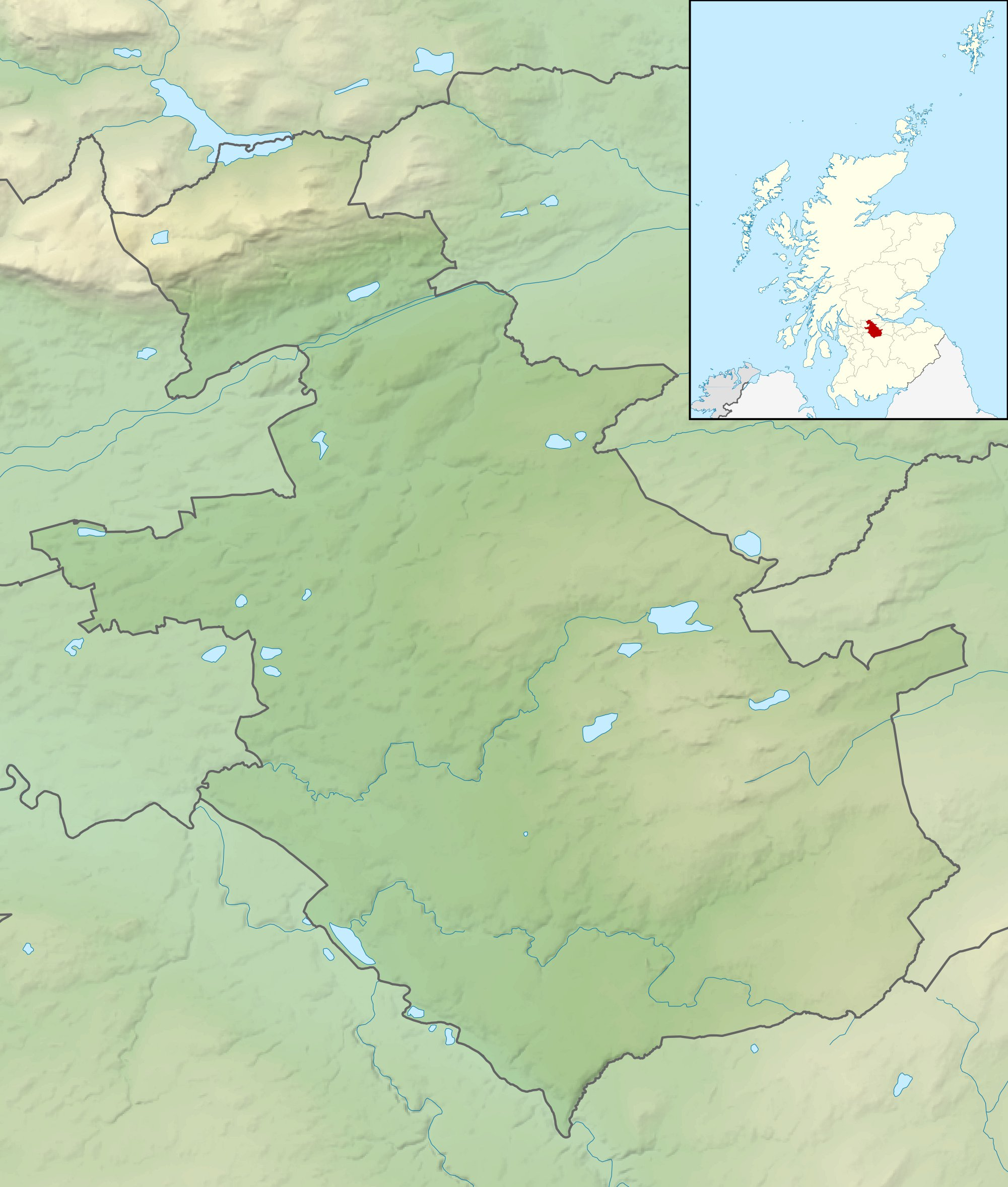
- Shown within Scotland
- Coordinates: 55.961920°N 3.964127°W

Cumbernauld Castle was the predecessor of Cumbernauld House in the Park in Cumbernauld. The Motte of the earliest castle survives, and stones of the second castle are incorporated in the present house.

== Comyn's castle ==
The first castle was owned by the Comyn Family and was granted to the Fleming family after Robert the Bruce killed John 'the Red' Comyn in 1306 in Greyfriars kirk. The Motte of this Motte and Bailey castle can still be made out in Cumbernauld House Park just north-east (approximately 360 metres (1,180 ft)) of Cumbernauld House. The Fleming family then constructed the second and larger castle on the site. Recent research has uncovered a charter, dated 3 November 1421, was issued at Cumbernauld Castle and was used to formally grant James Fleming his father's land, following allegations of murder.

== Fleming of Boghall and Cumbernauld ==
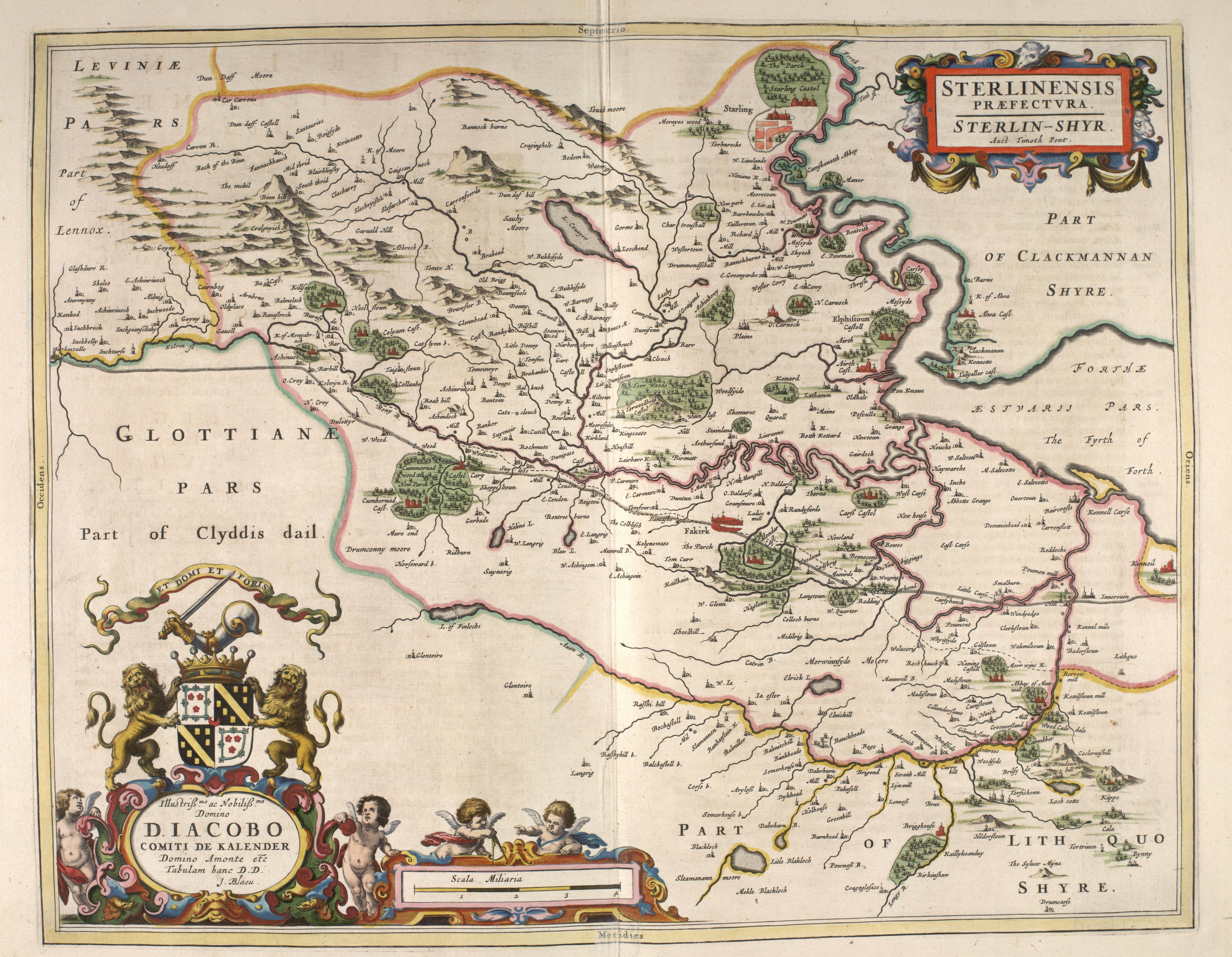
Blaeu - Atlas of Scotland 1654, shows Cumbernad Cast. and Cummernad Wood in Sterlin-shyr. Based on Timothy Pont's map below

When the Flemings came to construct their castle at the end of the 14th century, the best they would have been able to build would have been a strong stone tower. The country was much too impoverished to permit anything more ambitious, such as the great courtyard strongholds built before the death of Alexander III.

Such a tower would have been an "L-Plan", a rectangular block with a wing projecting at the end of one of the long sides. A few small timber or stone outbuildings would also have been attached. As time went on, and the power and influence of the family grew, the castle would have been enlarged by the addition of other stone structures, such as a great hall for festive occasions. In March 1544, an unexpected English visitor during the War of the Rough Wooing, Edmund Storey, a servant of Thomas Wharton, described his reception by Lord Fleming;

"On the morrow, in riding towards Stirling, we came to Lord Fleming's castle of Cumbernall, and alighted near the castle gates, at which the Scotsman knocked and told the porter that a servant of the Master of Maxwell's came with a message. Thus I got access to Flemyng and said that a servant of Lord Wharton's was at the gates with letters for him. He was astonished, but sent for me, I thereupon delivered him the King's letters both to him and Maxwell. He kissed the letters and took off his bonnet, saying: "Jesus benedicite! how thou durst come hither into this country? but I am glad that thou art come to my house, and since thou art here the highest stone shall be the lowest ere thou shalt take any skaith." "

Lord Fleming meant that he rather see his house destroyed than any harm come to this English visitor. The site of this castle is where Cumbernauld house stands today and although the original tower has disappeared, blocks of its masonry can be picked out amongst the stones used to construct Cumbernauld House.

Part of the courtyard buildings are still standing, particularly the wall that separates the lower service area from the car park. On the lower side of this, there is a long row of corbels or projecting stones, of a distinctive 16th century pattern, designed to support timbers of a lean-to building.

The castle played host to the royalty of Scotland. James IV wooed Margaret Drummond at Cumbernauld Castle, where Margaret's sister was married to Lord Fleming. The Drummonds' sisters lie buried in Dunblane Cathedral following their poisoning by a government determined to marry an unwilling King James to the sister of Henry VIII of England, Margaret Tudor. The murders made James IV a frequent visitor to Cumbernauld, Margaret Tudor accompanying him on one occasion.

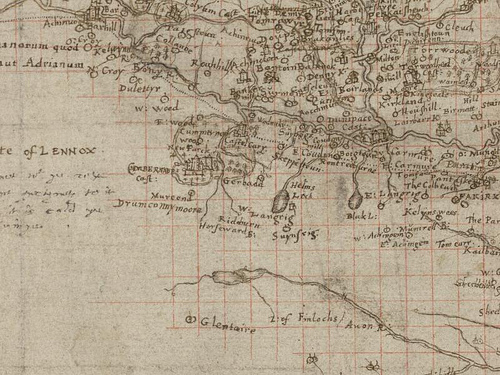
Timothy Pont's Map of Cumbernauld, c.1590 - close-up below

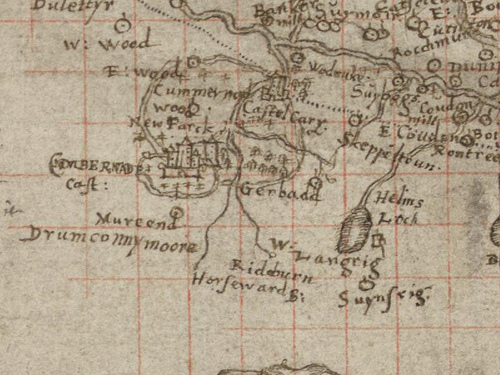
Pont's Map close-up

Mary Fleming was one of the four "Queen's Maries". Mary and her brother, James, Lord Fleming went into exile with Mary, Queen of Scots in France in 1548. In 1558, Lord Fleming was one of the Scottish Commissioners arranging the Queen's marriage to the Dauphin of France, the future Francis II of France. Fleming and other commissioners died mysteriously on the voyage home, poison being suspected.

Mary, Queen of Scots, visited the castle and planted a yew tree at Castlecary Castle, only a mile or two away, which still grows there. The great hall collapsed while the queen was staying on 26 January 1562, and 7 or 8 men were killed. Most of the queen's party were out hunting, Mary was not hurt and visited the relatives of those who were injured or killed in the village below.

During the Marian Civil War, John Fleming, 5th Lord Fleming supported Mary, Queen of Scots and held Dumbarton Castle in her name. Regent Lennox sacked Cumbernauld in September 1570 and expelled his wife Elizabeth Ross and her three infant children.

In 1640, eighteen Scottish noblemen met at Cumbernauld to sign the Cumbernauld Bond to oppose the policies of the Earl of Argyll who controlled the dominant political faction in Scotland. Cumbernauld may have been created a Burgh of barony in 1649, although there is some dispute from Hugo Millar. The Earl of Wigton was ordered to garrison the castle in 1650. Cumbernauld Castle was besieged and largely destroyed by Cromwell's General Monck in 1651. Irvine records that the old castle was burned to the ground by "a party of Highlanders during the rebellion of 1715."

== On maps ==
Probably the earliest map which shows the castle is Pont's Map but is much easier to pick out on Blaeu's coloured map above. These are reminiscent of the modern Friends of the Glen map which is also a stylised representation of the Park. Herman Moll's 1745 map has a brief mention of Cumbernard Castle even though it had been replaced by the House in 1731 unless the reference is to the stable destroyed in 1746. The top section of Charles Ross' map from 1777 has a section on Cumernauld and shows the castle has been replaced by the house and also has some obscure placenames like Hollinhirst (sometimes spelled Holland Hirst or Holland Hirxt) which don't appear on modern maps. None of the maps show the "Ridburn" or its tributaries with any accuracy, although The Bog Stank and Walton Burn seem to be shown. Another stream named as the Horseward Burn is mentioned and is shown to join with the Red Burn. The "Luggie fl." features on Pont as flowing into "Kirkintillo" but seems to have no connection with Cumbernauld or the mysterious Horseward Burn. On Pont 32 the Luggie originates in a neat archaeological note in Latin north-east of Glasgow. It says:

Vestigia valli Romanorum quod
videtur Agricolam aut Adrianum
Primum posuisse

Which translates as:

'the remains of the Roman fortification which
it seems Agricola or Hadrian
first built'

There is also Gordon's second and longer note, just west of Cumbernauld (lower centre), says:

"this part joyneth not w[ith] [th]e rest
of [th]e Lennox but outthruch to it
be annextion it is cald [th]e
parochin of [th]e Leinyie"

The dotted line running west–east across the map represents the line of the Roman Antonine Wall.

The Pont map overlaps with the Glasgow and Lanark Pont 34 map which is the only one which is dated as near Kirkintilloch it says:

Sept. et
Octobr.
1596 Descri
pta

The Luggie W. is mentioned on that map too in large rotated handwriting but there is little clarity on the watercourse. Whether Pont had even heard of "The Meeting of the Waters" is unclear.

== Caledonian white cattle ==
At the time of Queen Mary's visits, the park was still stocked with deer and wild white cattle. Many were taken for the table of Regent Lennox in Edinburgh in 1570 when John, Lord Fleming fought for the rights of the exiled Queen. John Lesley, Bishop of Ross, wrote of the white "kye" (cows); "this kind of kye and bullis hes bene thir mony yeres in the said forest, and the like was not mayntened in any other parte of this Ile of Albion, as is well known."

Hector Boece mentioned the Caledonian white cattle at Cumbernauld in his Historia Gentis Scotorum, (1527), which were also kept in the Torwood Forest near Stirling. The Swiss naturalist Conrad Gessner included an illustration in an appendix to his Historiae Animalium: Quadrupedes Ovipares, (1554), the picture was supplied by Gessner's Scottish correspondent Henry Sinclair, Dean of Glasgow.

== Archaeological research ==
After the new house was built, the castle was converted to stables, and was burned down by dragoons posted here in 1746. One original wall can still be seen in the allotment area.

In 1963-64, Cumbernauld Historical society, in co-operation with Glasgow archaeological society excavated an area to the north-east of Cumbernauld House and uncovered part of the domestic periphery of the castle, comprising a 15th-century rubbish chute, an adjoining prison and cellar and a well house reached by a flight of steps. In 1981-82 Cumbernauld and Kilsyth district museums excavated an area adjacent to the earlier excavation and found a cobbled courtyard, the base of a circular building and significant walling. These excavations have been filled back in.
