= Jean Fleming, Countess of Cassilis =

Scottish noblewoman (1553/4–1609)

Jean Fleming, Countess of Cassilis (1553/4–1609) was a Scottish noblewoman and courtier at the court of James VI of Scotland, and a survivor of domestic violence.

== Biography ==
Jean Fleming was born in 1553/4, daughter of James Fleming, 4th Lord Fleming and Barbara Hamilton, a sister of Lord John Hamilton and Claude Hamilton. Upon Lord Fleming's death, his title and estates passed to her uncle John Fleming, 5th Lord Fleming, and Jean Fleming had to resort to action in the Privy Council of Scotland to secure a share of the inheritance.

She married John Maitland, then Keeper of the Privy Seal of Scotland and later Lord Chancellor of Scotland, on 16 January 1583 and she was then called "Lady Thirlestane". He was 11 years older than her. The couple had two children, Anne, born in 1590 and who died in 1609, and John Maitland, a judge who became President of the Parliament of Scotland and of Privy Council.

In December 1587 the poet William Fowler dedicated his Triumphs of Petrarke to her, and a woman "E. D.", perhaps Elizabeth Douglas of Temple-Hall (Ormiston), contributed two sonnets in her praise.

=== Lady Chancellor ===
Jean Fleming shared in her husband's work as Chancellor of Scotland. An English visitor at the Scottish court, Thomas Fowler, wrote that she was "a wise woman and half chancellor when he is at home." The goldsmith and royal financier Thomas Foulis made two accounts of money for the mint received from "Lady Thirlestane." The first of the "Lady Chancellaris" accounts commenced on 20 June 1589, and the second began on 1 August 1590. Fleming herself received an amethyst ring. She accounted large sums of money, some of it connected with the reception of the royal bride, Anne of Denmark. The account, held by the National Library of Scotland, includes a payment to Alexander Oustean, a wealthy Edinburgh tailor who supported the royal marriage, and £4000 Scots for the merchant Robert Jousie who supplied fabrics to the royal wardrobe.

In February 1590 she was pregnant as a newsletter noted, "The Lady Chanceller feeles the motion of a barne within her weam." In May 1590 she may have greeted the new queen of Scotland Anne of Denmark at the Shore of Leith, with the Countess of Mar, Lady Seton, Lady Boyne, and Lady Dudhope. Her daughter Anne was baptised on 12 July 1590.

She managed to make an enemy of Anna of Denmark by remarking in her hearing of Anna's supposed relationship with Francis Stewart, 5th Earl of Bothwell, who had been imprisoned for witchcraft in connections with events around the marriage of Anne and James, and whose trajectory from this point forwards was escape, exile, forfeiture and death. The queen wrote a letter mentioning her accusation that she was complicit with the Earl of Bothwell.

In September and October 1592 Maitland and his wife were at Greenlaw with the Provost of Lincluden and at Kenmure and Drumlanrig with John Gordon of Lochinvar. Fleming then visited the court. Maitland was allowed to return to court in September 1593, but the English ambassador Robert Bowes mentioned the queen's continuing antipathy towards her, "she cannot hitherto well brook his wife". She was again in the queen's favour by February 1595.

=== Countess of Cassilis ===
On Maitland's death on 3 October 1595 the king sent Sir George Home with his letter to Thirlestane to comfort her. Jean was left a rich widow. In November 1597, she married John Kennedy, 5th Earl of Cassilis, some 22-years her junior, becoming Countess of Cassillis. The age disparity aroused considerable scornful comment in the Scottish court, but Jean's wealth ensured the continued status of the couple. It was said, "she was past bairns bearing, and he was a young man not past 23 years."

Cassilis had considered marrying another woman, Jean Cunningham, a daughter of the Earl of Glencairn. She died soon after the wedding, leaving a note blaming Cassilis for breaking their betrothal. This led to a quarrel between the Cunningham and Kennedy families.

The bankrupted royal financiers Robert Jousie and Thomas Foulis owed her £2,333 Scots in 1598. Kennedy was offered a post as Treasurer in 1599, but declined, fearing the cost of the appointment in terms of anticipated loans to a needy James VI.

On 22 February 1600 Fleming and Cassilis hosted James VI at Thirlestane Castle. In 1602 she was contrasted with the Catholic Lady Livingstone as "a lady without all religion".

As part of the marriage contract of her daughter Anna Maitland and the Master of Winton, Jean Fleming rebuilt Winton Castle for the couple, and the Earl of Winton owed her 2,000 merks for this.

Lady Cassilis and her son had rights over the town of Leith, and the burgh council of Edinburgh negotiated to buy the "reversion of the superiority of Leith from her. She received 10,000 merks.

Kennedy was imprisoned twice in 1604 for doing violence to Jean, the first incident involving him dragging her from court before witnesses. The Privy Council described the offence as "unmanerlie insolence". King James advised the Privy Council of Scotland to protect her financial interests from her husband.

During this period it was alleged that Hector Ferguson of Letterpin had ambushed Jean Fleming and servants between the Inch of Galloway and Maybole, and chased her to Maybole Castle.

Jean Fleming died in Edinburgh after a period of illness on 23 June 1609 and is buried in St Mary's Collegiate Church, Haddington.
