= Boghall Castle =

Coordinates: 55.617°N 3.525°W

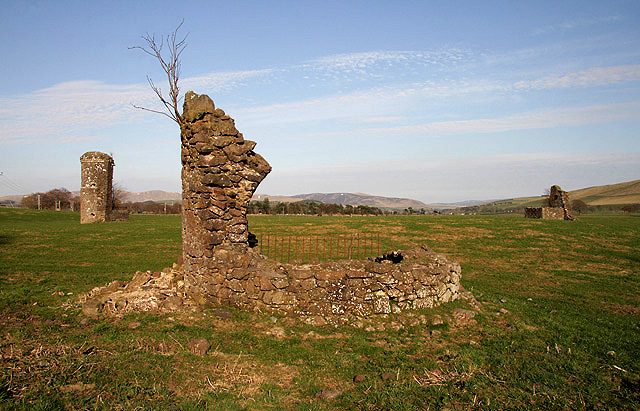
Ruins of Boghall Castle

Boghall Castle was a 14th-century castle to the south of Biggar, South Lanarkshire, Scotland. Boghall became ruinous in the 19th century.

== History ==
The courtyard castle was built in the 14th century by the Fleming family, to replace the motte and bailey castle at Biggar. The castle was strategically sited where the valleys of the River Tweed and the River Clyde meet.

The foundations of two D-shaped towers survive but the rest is ruinous.

Edward II of England stayed at Boghall in 1310. During 1473, Queen Margaret, wife of James III of Scotland, stayed the night at Boghall on her way to the shrine of St. Ninian in Whithorn.

Mary, Queen of Scots stayed at Boghall in 1565. Regent Moray came to Boghall with an army on 11 June 1568 and the castle surrendered to him. He did not slight or demolish it, because Lord Fleming held Dumbarton Castle against him, and he hoped to negotiate.

On 14 November 1569, Regent Moray gave soldiers, commanded by James Cunningham, 20 shillings in drinksilver for their labours in confiscating the goods of Lord Fleming at Boghall. The farm stock taken from Boghall included 8 oxen, 13 cows, a bull, and a flock of 617 sheep.

Regent Lennox sacked the houses of Cumbernauld and Boghall in September and October 1570, and expelled Lord Fleming's wife Elizabeth Ross and her three infant children from her properties.

An inventory of goods at Boghall Castle was made in October 1578 after the death of Elizabeth Ross, Lady Fleming, the wife of John Fleming, 5th Lord Fleming. These include rich bed hangings and canopies of velvet and silk and gilded wooden knops and finials for beds.
