= Thomas Fleming, Earl of Wigtown =

Scottish earl

Thomas Fleming, Earl of Wigtown (died c. 1382) was the second person to hold the title earl of Wigtown. He was the grandson of the previous earl, Sir Malcolm Fleming, through the latter's only son John (d. 1351). His mother was a woman named Marjorie.

Thomas had been the heir to the earldom since the death of his father in 1351. During King David II of Scotland's captivity in England, Thomas was frequently used as a hostage, and spent many years in captivity, especially after the Treaty of Berwick in 1357. Thomas subsequently had grave financial problems, probably due to the ransom he had to pay the English crown to be released.

In 1367, Thomas was regranted the earldom, but was stripped of the rights of regality enjoyed by his grandfather. Thomas sold the earldom to Archibald the Grim, Lord of Galloway, later Earl of Douglas, in 1372. The recreation of the Lordship of Galloway for Archibald the Grim in 1369 had posed some conceptual problems for the earldom, as it fell within the old territories of the lordship. The Douglases were, moreover, much more successful than the Flemings at crushing resistance to the Bruce dynasty in the south-west.

Thomas thus had the unusual fortune of being demoted from the rank of a magnate to that of a baron. Thomas subsequently seems to have given away just about all of his remaining lands. He died without issue in or before 1382.

Preceded by Malcolm Fleming	Earl of Wigtown; 1363 x 1367-1372	Succeeded by Archibald ('the Grim') Douglas
