= Biggar Castle =

Castle in Biggar, South Lanarkshire, Scotland

Coordinates: 55.6238°N 3.5268°W

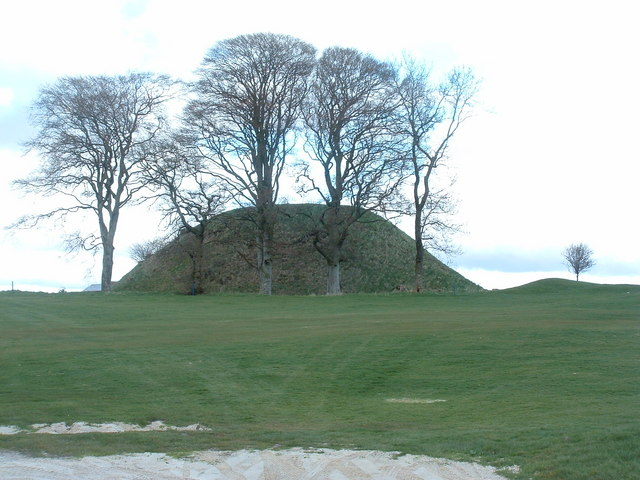
Biggar Castle motte in 2005.

Biggar Castle was a 12th-century castle in Biggar, South Lanarkshire, Scotland. It appears to have been abandoned by the 14th century.

== History ==
The motte and bailey castle was built in the 12th century by Baldwin of Biggar, who received the barony of Biggar from David I of Scotland. Baldwin and his son Waltheof were Sheriffs of Lanarkshire.

It passed to the Fleming family in the 13th century with the marriage of Marjory, heiress of Biggar, the daughter of Nicholas de Biggar (died c. 1291) and was held by the Fleming family until the 14th century. The Fleming family abandoned the castle for Boghall Castle. The motte is still extant of the castle.
