= Malcolm Fleming, Earl of Wigtown =

Scottish nobleman and soldier

Malcolm Fleming, Earl of Wigtown (died c. 1363) was the son of Robert Fleming of Clan Fleming, a Stewart vassal and holder of the lands of Fulwood and Cumbernauld, who died sometime before 1314. He was the "foster-father" of King David II of Scotland and became the first man to hold the title Earl of Wigtown.

Malcolm was given the barony of Kirkintilloch forfeited from the Comyns by King Robert I of Scotland during the First War of Scottish Independence and received other lands in Lennox and Wigtownshire. Malcolm became Sheriff of Dumbarton and keeper of the castle thereafter.

Malcolm was on the defeated Bruce side at the Battle of Halidon Hill in July 1333, but managed to escape, and fled back to Dumbarton. He was partly responsible for sending the boy king, Robert's son David II from Dumbarton to exile in France. When David II returned to Scotland in 1341, David granted Malcolm much of western Galloway (Wigtownshire) and the burgh of Wigtown, and created for him the new title, "Earl of Wigtown". It was the first new earldom in Scotland for more than a century (the last was the earldom of Sutherland). Presumably the intention was to re-establish the power of the Bruce dynasty in the strongly Balliol province.

On 17 October 1346, Malcolm was captured at the Battle of Neville's Cross and imprisoned by Robert Bertram, sheriff of Northumberland, but escaped the following year to Scotland. Malcolm remained a favourite of David II. He married a woman called Marjorie, who became David II's nurse. He had four known children, one son and three daughters. Malcolm died in or sometime shortly before 1363, and was succeeded by his grandson Thomas, heir since 1351.

Malcolm's successor to the earldom of Wigtown, his grandson Thomas, had grave financial problems and was stripped of the rights of regality given to his grandfather. The recreation of the Lordship of Galloway for Archibald the Grim in 1369 posed some conceptual problems for the earldom, as it fell within the old territories of the lordship. Thomas found himself in grave financial difficulties and sold the earldom to Archibald in 1372.

== Bibliography ==
- Oram, Richard D., 'Fleming, Malcolm, first earl of Wigtown (d. in or before 1363)’, Oxford Dictionary of National Biography, Oxford University Press, 2004 accessed 14 Nov 2006
- Paul, James Balfour, The Scots Peerage, Vol. VIII, (Edinburgh, 1911)

| Preceded by New Creation | Earl of Wigtown; 1341-x 1363 | Succeeded by Thomas Fleming |
