= John Fleming, 1st Earl of Wigtown =

Scottish nobleman (c.1567–1619)

John Fleming, 6th or 7th Lord Fleming (1567–1619), Scottish aristocrat and diplomat.

== Early life ==
John was the son of John Fleming, 5th Lord Fleming (great grandson of King James IV of Scotland) and Elizabeth Ross. His main residence was Boghall Castle at Biggar, home of the Fleming family. He was thought to be a Catholic.

== Career ==
In October 1590 James VI of Scotland sent John, Lord Fleming as ambassador to Christian IV of Denmark and to Johann VII, Duke of Mecklenburg and Henry Julius, Duke of Brunswick-Lüneburg. He travelled to London first.

According to the English diplomat George Nicholson, in March 1601 Fleming was thought to have plotted against three courtiers close to the king, Sir George Home, Sir David Murray, and Sir Thomas Erskine.

He was created Earl of Wigtown in 1606 in the Peerage of Scotland.

== Personal life ==
John Fleming married Lilias Graham, daughter of John Graham, 3rd Earl of Montrose in October 1585. Their children included:

- John Fleming, 2nd Earl of Wigtown (1589–1650), who was baptised at Kincardine Castle on 5 December 1589. The christening was attended by the Duke of Lennox and the Earl of Bothwell.
- Lady Anna Fleming (d. 1625), who married William Livingstone of Darnchester, a son of William Livingstone of Kilsyth and Antoinette de Bord. After his death in 1614, she married John Seton of Barns, grandson of Sir John Seton of Barns.

Lord Wigtown died in 1619.

Peerage of Scotland
New creation	Earl of Wigtown; 1606–1619	Succeeded by John Fleming
Preceded by John Fleming	Lords Fleming; 1572 – 1619	Succeeded by John Fleming
