= Robert Crichton, 6th Lord Crichton of Sanquhar =

6th Lord Crichton of Sanquhar

Robert Crichton, 6th Lord Crichton of Sanquhar, (died 1561) was the son of William Crichton, 5th Lord Crichton of Sanquhar and Elizabeth Fleming, daughter of Malcolm Fleming, 3rd Lord Fleming.

Robert became Lord Sanquhar after his father was murdered in Edinburgh in 1552 by Robert Lord Semple.

Robert married Margaret Cunningham of Caprington, but died without children, and his younger brother Edward became the 7th Lord Crichton of Sanquhar.

Peerage of Scotland
Preceded by William Crichton	Lord Crichton of Sanquhar; 1550–1561	Succeeded by Edward Crichton
