= Dumbarton Castle =

Historic location in Dumbarton, Scotland

- Dumbarton, Scotland; GB grid reference
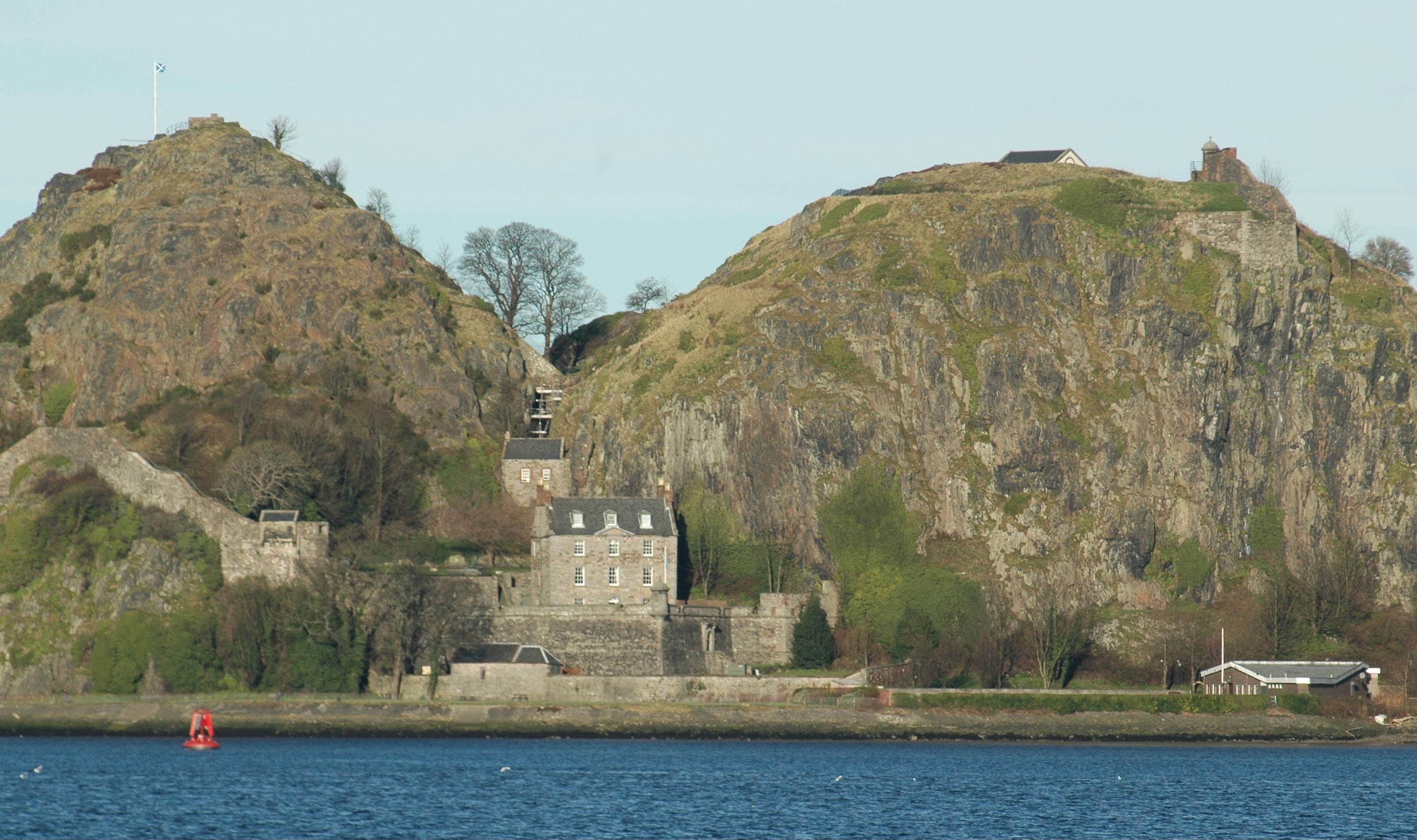
- View of Dumbarton Castle from across the River Clyde

Site information
- Owner: Scottish Government
- Controlled by: Historic Environment Scotland
- Open to the public: Yes

Location
- Location of Dumbarton Castle within West Dunbartonshire
- Location within West Dunbartonshire
- Coordinates: 55.9360°N 4.5628°W

Site history
- Built: Site occupied since the Iron Age
- In use: Still in use today

Designations

Scheduled monument
- Official name: Dumbarton Castle
- Designated: 25 April 1994
- Reference no.: SM90107

Dumbarton Castle (Scottish Gaelic: Dùn Breatainn, pronounced [t̪unˈpɾʲɛʰt̪ɪɲ]; Welsh: Alt Clut) has the longest recorded history of any stronghold in Scotland. It sits on a volcanic plug of basalt known as Dumbarton Rock which is 240 feet (73 m) high and overlooks the Scottish town of Dumbarton.

== History ==
Dumbarton Rock was formed between 330 and 340 million years ago, during the Early Carboniferous period, a time of widespread volcanic activity in the area where Glasgow is now situated; over time, the softer exterior of the volcano weathered away, leaving behind a volcanic plug of basalt.

=== Iron Age ===
At least as far back as the Iron Age, this has been the site of a strategically important settlement, as evidenced by archaeological finds.

The people that came to reside there in the era of Roman Britain were known to have traded with the Romans. However the first written record about a settlement there was in a letter that Saint Patrick wrote to King Ceretic of Alt Clut in the late 5th century.

=== Early Medieval era ===
David Nash Ford has proposed that Dumbarton was the Cair Brithon ('Fort of the Britons') listed by Nennius among the 28 cities of Sub-Roman Britain. From the 5th century until the 9th, the castle was the centre of the independent Brythonic Kingdom of Strathclyde. Alt Clut or Alcluith (Scottish Gaelic: Alt Chluaidh, pronounced [aɫ̪d̪̊ˈxɫ̪uəj], lit. 'Rock of the Clyde'), the Brythonic name for Dumbarton Rock, became a metonym for the kingdom. The king of Dumbarton in about AD 570 was Riderch Hael, who features in Welsh and Latin works.

Merlin was said to have stayed at Alt Clut. The medieval Scalacronica of Sir Thomas Grey recorded the legend that says that "Arthur left Hoël of Brittany his nephew sick at Alcluit in Scotland." Hoël made a full recovery, but was besieged in the castle by the Scots and Picts. The story first appeared in Geoffrey of Monmouth's Historia Regum Britanniae. Amongst lists of three things, in the triads of the Red Book of Hergest, the third "Unrestrained Ravaging" was Aeddan Fradog (the Wily, perhaps Áedán mac Gabráin), coming to the court of Rhydderch the Generous at Alclud, who left neither food nor drink nor beast alive. This battle also appears in stories of Myrddin Wyllt, the Merlin of Geoffrey of Monmouth's Vita Merlini, perhaps conflated with the battle of Arfderydd, located as Arthuret by some authors.

In 756, the first (and second) losses of Dumbarton Rock were recorded. A joint force of Picts and Northumbrians captured the fortress after a siege, only to lose it again a few days later. By 870, it was home to a tightly packed British settlement, which served as a fortress and as the capital of Alt Clut. In 871, the Irish-based Viking kings Amlaíb Conung and Ímar laid siege to Dumbarton Rock. The fortress fell in four months, after its water supply failed. The kings are recorded to have returned to Ireland with 200 ships and a host of British, English, and Pictish captives. These prisoners may have included the ruling family of Alt Clut including the king Arthgal ap Dyfnwal, who was slain the following year under uncertain circumstances. Following the Viking destruction of the fortress, Dumbarton Rock does not appear on record again until the 13th century, and the capital of the restructured Kingdom of Strathclyde appears to have relocated up the Clyde to the vicinity of Partick and Govan.

=== Medieval era ===
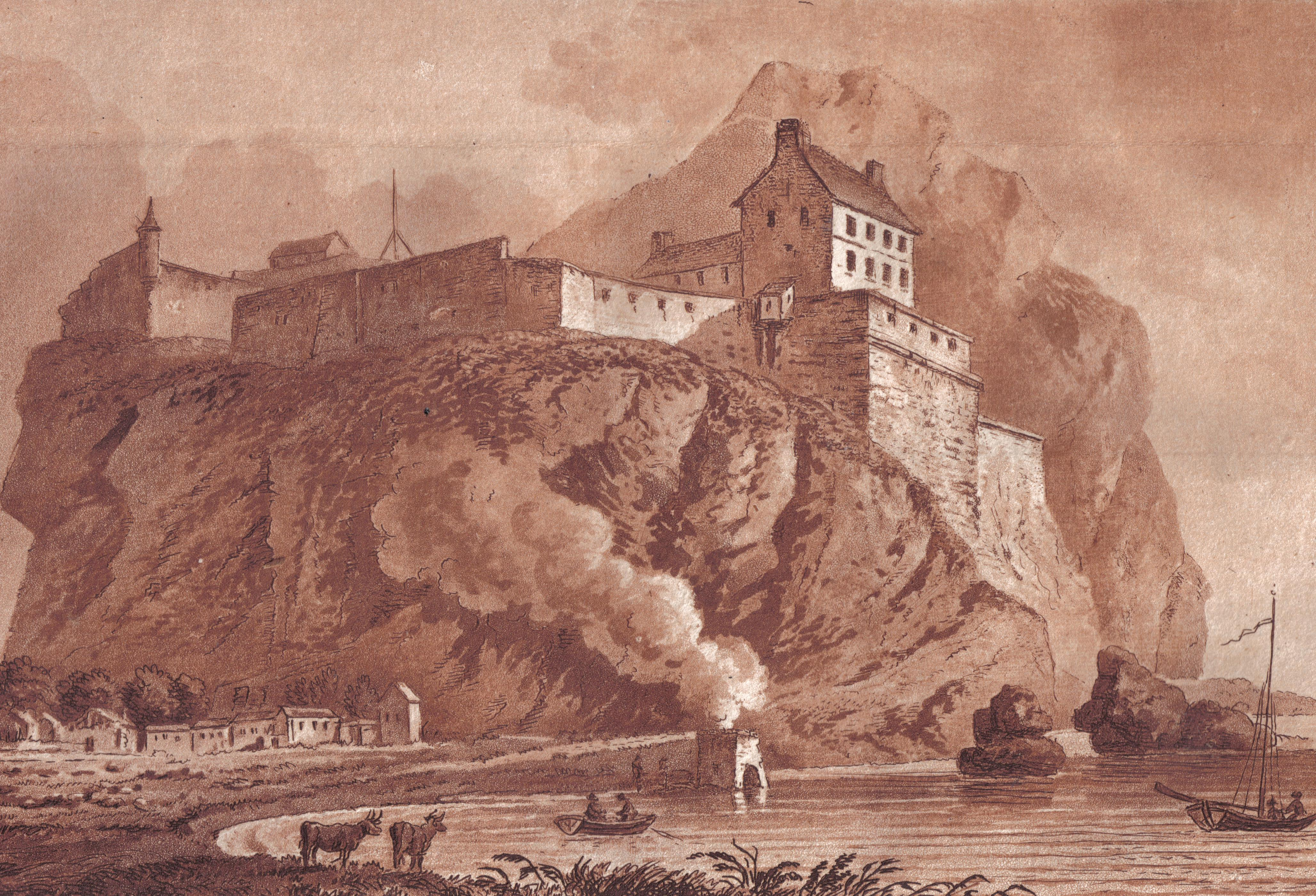
Dumbarton castle in 1800

In medieval Scotland, Dumbarton (Dùn Breatainn, which means "the fortress of the Britons") was an important royal castle. It is believed to be the place Sir John Menteith took William Wallace on the way to London after Wallace's capture.

The Governor of the castle in 1333, Malcolm Fleming of Fulwood, had earlier served as tutor to the young David II. He sheltered the king and his young wife, Joan of The Tower after the Scottish defeat at Halidon Hill on 19 July. He later safely conveyed the royal couple to greater safety in France, attended by his daughter Evota Fleming, as Maid of Honour. The king and queen remained in France for eight years, but Malcolm Fleming returned to Dumbarton and continued to hold it safely against an English siege. In doing so he also protected the 17-year-old Robert the Steward (later King Robert II). For these services David II created Fleming the First Earl of Wigtown (the first new Scottish earldom created in more than a century).

Wigtown was still Governor in 1361 when the Black Death again swept into Scotland and a third of the castle's garrison died. Following his own death a year later he was succeeded as Sheriff of Dunbartonshire and Governor of Dumbarton Castle by his nephew, Malcolm Fleming of Biggar.

In 1425 the castle was attacked by James Mor Stewart ("James the Fat"), youngest son of Murdoch Stewart, Duke of Albany, who had been imprisoned by King James I of Scotland on charges of treason. James the Fat became a rallying point for enemies of the King, and raised a rebellion against the crown. He marched on the town of Dumbarton and burned it, but was unable to take the castle, whose defender Sir John Colquhoun successfully held out against James' men. He was rewarded by the king, James I of Scotland, with the governorship of the royal castle, which he held until his death in 1439.

=== James IV and Dumbarton ===
The former supporters of James III under the leadership of John Stewart, 1st Earl of Lennox met up at Dumbarton Castle in October 1489. They had hoped to gain the support of Henry VII of England. James IV defeated them in a battle between the Touch and Menteith hills near Stirling on 11 and 12 October. James IV used Dumbarton as the west coast base for his navy and campaigns to subdue the Western Isles. James was at Dumbarton with the Chancellor of Scotland, Colin Campbell, 1st Earl of Argyll, in November 1489. He had the use of a ship belonging to the Laird of Luss. In the following February a royal ship was 'chaysit' by the English and lost some of her cables. In 1494 a row barge was built at Dumbarton for the king using timber from Loch Lomond.

In March 1495 James IV was provided with a camp bed for use at sea and a boat carried cannon to Dumbarton. Patrick Hepburn, 1st Earl of Bothwell, was made Captain of the castle on 1 April 1495. A man played on the clarschaw, a Gaelic harp, for the King. In 1503, on the day after his wedding to Margaret Tudor, James gave the castle to his new queen. In 1505 Dumbarton was the King's base for visiting the Western Isles. One ship's mast was made from timber from Drymen. On 5 June James was entertained by a French "quhissilar" (whistler), perhaps playing a recorder and on 8 June James played cards with John Murray and Master Robert Cockburn losing £4 and 10 shillings, and later that day attended Evensong in the Parish kirk and College of Dumbarton. In 1505 John Ramsay built a ship for the King called the Columb (Saint Columba being the father of Christianity in Scotland). In December 1505 a sword that had belonged to William Wallace was repaired.

=== Regent Albany, James V and the circumnavigation of Scotland ===
On 18 May 1515 the James or the Margaret with six other ships brought John Stewart, Regent Albany to Dumbarton. These royal ships were repaired at Dumbarton in July and new docks were made for them. John Drummond of Milnab brought fourteen of their guns to Glasgow. In September Regent Albany held court at Dumbarton, and received Thomas Benolt, the English Clarenceux King of Arms. The Carrick Herald and Clarenceux were sent to Lord Maxwell. In March 1516 Albany issued six letters of remission (forgiveness) to those who had held the castle for Lennox against the king in 1489. Regent Albany sailed from Dumbarton to France on 31 May 1524.

In 1526 John Stewart, 3rd Earl of Lennox fortified Dumbarton against the Douglas faction who had control of the young James V, but his forces were defeated by Archibald Douglas, 6th Earl of Angus at the battle of Linlithgow Bridge. James Hamilton of Finnart, who was implicated in the death of the Earl of Lennox, was given custody of the castle till 1531. Later in his personal reign James V used the castle as a prison for those convicted at the justice ayre, receiving their fines and composition payments in 1539. In 1540 James circumnavigated Scotland from the Forth and arrived at Dumbarton with Cardinal Beaton, the Earl of Huntly, and the Earl of Arran each leading a force of five hundred men. This expedition was later published by Nicolas de Nicolay Seigneur d'Arfeville, cosmographer to the King of France in 1583, with the first modern map of Scotland's coastline.

=== Lennox and Mary, Queen of Scots ===
Matthew, Earl of Lennox had been an ally of the French party in Scotland led by Mary of Guise but committed himself to the pro-English faction. In 1544 munitions and ten thousand French crowns of the sun arrived with Jacques de la Brosse at Dumbarton's harbour and were secured by Lennox and the Earl of Glencairn. Lennox then went into England, leaving the castle in the keeping of William Stirling of Glorat. Lennox signed a deal with Henry VIII of England offering Dumbarton Castle and the Isle of Bute in return for land in England and marriage to Henry's niece Margaret Douglas, and the future Governorship of Scotland if circumstances permitted. Lennox undertook to prevent the infant queen Mary being taken from Scotland. However, George Stirling of Glorat, unhappy at this policy, prevented Lennox returning into the castle and he was forced to sail to Ireland. George Stirling declared that he would hold the castle in the name of the young queen only. The Privy Council of Scotland agreed to George Stirling's plan. Despite this, more French troops landed at Dumbarton under the leadership of Gabriel de Montgomery, the soldier who later killed Henry II of France at a joust in 1559.

In May 1545 Lennox tried to take the castle, with soldiers commanded by his brother, Robert Stewart, Bishop of Caithness. He sailed from Chester with around 20 followers in May 1546 in the Katherine Goodman and a pinnace. Regent Arran besieged the castle with a superior force, having borrowed the artillery of the Earl of Argyle and ordering Robert Hamilton of Briggis to bring guns from Dunbar. George Stirling of Glorat surrendered after 20 days and made terms. The chronicle historian John Lesley wrote that the Captain and the Bishop surrendered the castle to Arran and were rewarded, after negotiation by the Earl of Huntly. The siege at Dumbarton delayed Arran's action at the siege of St Andrews Castle on the East coast of Scotland.

Thereafter the castle was in the hands of Regent Arran and he held court in person there in July giving legal remission to the keeper of the Castle and in March 1547 acknowledging the good service of George Stirling of Glorat in rendering the castle to him.

As the war of the Rough Wooing continued, Mary, Queen of Scots was lodged in the castle by 22 February 1548. Alexander Cunningham, 5th Earl of Glencairn wrote to Mary of Guise from Dumbarton that he had received a French cargo, and it would be as safe as if it were in Stirling Castle. The English commander Grey of Wilton proposed basing warships at Lamlash on Arran as a convenient base to watch for French ships coming for Mary.

Mary of Guise was at the castle in the first days of May 1548 and Mary, Queen of Scots was kept at the castle for several months before her embarkation for France for safety on 13 July 1548. The Castle Governor at this time was James Fleming, 4th Lord Fleming who accompanied the queen's party to France. The sailing however was delayed by adverse winds till 7 August 1548. Her party including her governess Lady Fleming and the Four Marys left the Clyde in a fleet under the command of Nicolas de Villegagnon and Michel de Seure. They sailed around the west coast of Ireland, to avoid English ships commanded by Edward Clinton. In France she was soon betrothed to the young dauphin Francis.

Regent Arran made Andrew Hamilton captain and keeper of Dumbarton. In 1557, there was war between England and Scotland again. According to a rumour heard by Gilbert Kennedy, 3rd Earl of Cassilis, five hundred Gascon soldiers arrived at Dumbarton destined to serve on the borders against the English for Mary of Guise.

=== Marian Civil War, Regent Morton, and the Dukes of Lennox ===
Mary, Queen of Scots stayed at Dumbarton Castle in July 1563. During the rebellion against her in 1565 known as the "Chaseabout Raid", conflict came near to the castle. Mary's supporter John Colquhoun of Luss issued a proclamation at Rossdhu Castle, on 15 October, that the people of Dumbarton should prepare to resist the army of the Earl of Argyll at the Hill of Ardmore. The captain of Dumbarton Castle would be watchful and have ships in the Clyde fire their guns at the Earl's boats on the river.

After her defeat at the Battle of Langside in 1568, Mary tried to reach the Castle, but went instead to England. John Fleming, 5th Lord Fleming, keeper of the Castle went with her into England and was allowed to return. When William Kirkcaldy of Grange governor of Edinburgh Castle changed sides to support Mary, this became a problem for Regent Moray. The subsequent conflict is known as the Marian Civil War.

The first siege of Dumbarton was lifted because of the assassination of Regent Moray in January 1570. The assassin James Hamilton of Bothwellhaugh was welcomed at Dumbarton. Fleming's defence of Dumbarton for Mary was staunch, assisted by the timely arrival of supply ships from France under the command of his cousin, Thomas Fleming. Lord Fleming's attempt to ambush the English general William Drury in May 1570 failed and was satirized in a ballad printed by Robert Lekprevik in May that year and attributed to Robert Sempill; The tressoun of Dumbertane. In October 1570 during the Marian civil war Fleming fortified the castle for Mary against the supporters of James VI of Scotland with stones obtained by demolishing churches and houses in Dumbarton and Cardross. The castle was captured by the forces of Regent Lennox led by Thomas Crawford of Jordanhill and John Cunningham of Drumquhassle in the early hours of 2 April 1571, who used ladders to scale the rock and surprise the garrison. Lord Fleming escaped by sea but died a year later when accidentally wounded by friendly fire as he supervised the supply of additional munitions at Edinburgh Castle.

Dumbarton Castle was used as prison for Regent Morton in June 1581 before his execution in Edinburgh. On 8 September 1582 the castle was put unto the keeping of William Stewart of Caverston an ally of Esmé Stewart, 1st Duke of Lennox, the King's favourite. The Duke of Lennox was displaced by the Gowrie Regime and went to the castle in secret pretending to be travelling from Edinburgh to nearby Dalkeith Palace. Lennox had his own ship there described as a barque. Robert Bowes, the English resident agent, expected the Duke of Lennox would sail to France from Dumbarton "having well victualled his shippe there." Other observers were anxious that the castle might become a foothold for French forces in Scotland allied to Lennox and his faction. In December 1582 two Englishmen in Lennox's service at Dumbarton left by his ship from Largs. Lennox himself travelled to France through England, never to return.

James VI made John Hamilton, 1st Marquis of Hamilton, captain of Dunbarton Castle in 1595, an office he was obliged to relinquish to the king's cousin and favourite Ludovic Stuart, 2nd Duke of Lennox, in January 1598. The king later visited Dunbarton during his progress and ate dinner at the castle on 24 August 1598. By 1620, Sir John Stewart, an illegitimate son of the 2nd Duke of Lennox, had been made constable and keeper of Dumbarton Castle.

=== Seventeenth century ===
Although few buildings remain from this period there are records of works in 1617, 1618, and 1628–9. A replacement Wallace Tower was built superseding the medieval building. In June 1618 masons were working on the upper storey and it was decided to make the tower larger. Externally it was finished with lime plaster called harling. At the south side there was a bell house. Lime and sand for the work was carried up the rock in bags by women recruited from the town. By 1627 it was discovered that the keeper Sir John Stewart of Methven had neglected the fortress. He was replaced by Sir John Stewart of Traquair who recorded the poor state of the building. Surviving accounts mostly record work on the artillery and the 'foir yet wall' a defence on the southern side. The Scottish Parliament in 1644 judged that the castle was likely to be more hurtful than useful to the country.

William Middlemest, the keeper in 1622, petitioned for better payment for the garrison. In November 1645 the Committee of Estates approved the recruitment of thirty extra soldiers by the keeper John Semple to guard the increased number of prisoners. The castle's strategic importance declined after Oliver Cromwell's death in 1658. However, due to threats posed by Jacobites and the French in the eighteenth century, new structures and defences were built and the castle was garrisoned until World War II. Some documentation for these later works is preserved in the National Archives of Scotland.

=== Inventories ===
Several lists of the castle's contents survive, including inventories from 1510, 1571, 1580, 1644, and 1668. These list guns and furniture and name many locations in the castle. There is also a list of cannon transported by John Drummond of Milnab to Dumbarton in 1536. In 1510 St Patricks chapel contained an old parchment mass book, a pewter chalice, and liturgical cloths. The hall had four tables and next to that was a chalmer of Dess, a 'solar' in English terms with a bed. The Wallace tower was protected with an iron yett and draw bar, there were bedchambers within and a bell at the head of the tower; the 'Wynde Hall' contained another bed.

In August 1536 George Stirling of Glorat took delivery from John Drummond the king's Master Wright of four great guns and six falcons on carriages with wheels, thirty three bronze hagbut hand-guns and four iron culverins, with ammunition and powder and ramrods for the big guns. John Drummond took away an old brass gun that was 10 feet (3 metres) long.

In 1571 amongst the cannon and guns there was a "gross culverin", two small "batteris", and a French "moyen" mounted for use on the walls. Another moyen was suitable for action in the field. There were two Brittany-made falcons on the walls, a quarter falcon and a "double barse". Provisions included eleven hogshead of biscuit. Some of the guns were subsequently taken to besiege Edinburgh Castle during the Marian civil war.

The document compiled in 1580 was "the inventar of the munitioun and uther insicht geir underwrittin left in the castell of Dumbertane be Johnne Conninghame of Drumquhassill and deliverit be the said Johnne to William Stewart of Cabirston in name and behalf of ane noble and potent lord Esme erll of Lennox lord Darnley and Obeigny on the 27 August 1580". There were six large cannon. The bed in the chamber of dais was now described as "ane stand bed of eistland tymmar with ruf and pannell of the same", a bed made from imported Baltic oak.

By 1644, when John Sempill was made keeper the 'Chamber of deisse' still contained a bed with a chamber pot and truckle bed for a servant, but it also contained armaments. There were twelve ram-rods, and three worms' - screws for unloading guns, three hagbuts and an iron flail. The hall contained twelve broken pikes, four without their iron blades. The contents of the armoury included thirty-three corslets, 105 helmets, and 43 swords.

In 1668 the Governor Francis Montgomerie of Giffin recorded that the first floor of a lodging called the 'new chamber' contained 'a quantity of old rusty guns and sword, so rusted broke and spoiled that they can never serve for any use, above the beds were 'insufficient' and in the top room there was spoiled matches. The windows of this new lodging were broken. Montgomerie was worried about the water-supply from the loch and the 'laigh' low well.

== Governors and Keepers ==
=== Governors ===
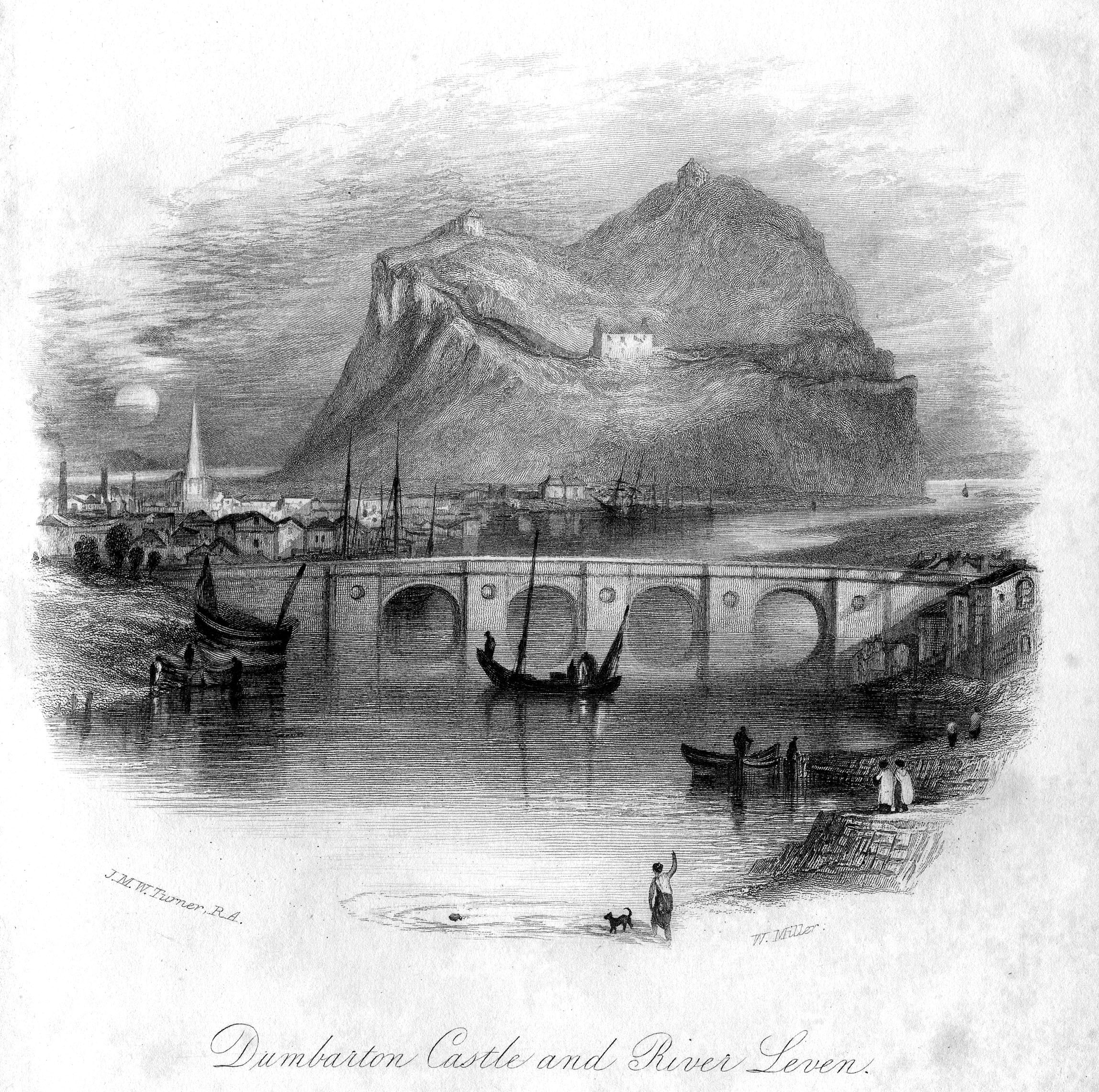
Dumbarton Castle, 1836 engraving by William Miller after J. M. W. Turner

- 1271: Walter_Bailloch Stewart
- 1288: Donnchadh III, Earl of Fife
- 1292: Sir Nicolas de Seagrave
- 1296: Sir Ingram de Umfraville
- 1296: Alexander de Ledes
- 1303: Sir John de Menteith
- 1308-53: Sir Malcolm Fleming of Fulwood and Cumbernauld, 1st Earl of Wigtown
- 1357: Sir Robert Erskine
- 1357-64: Sir John Danielstoun
- 1364-67: Sir Malcolm Fleming of Biggar
- 1369: Sir Robert Erskine
- 1371-75: Sir John Danielstoun
- 1377-79: Sir Robert Danielstoun
- 1400: Walter de Danyelstoun (later bishop of St Andrews)
- 1424: Sir John Colquhoun, 10th of Luss
- John Cunningham, 11th Earl of Glencairn
- 1546- 1562 James Hamilton, Duke of Chatellerault, 2nd Earl of Arran
- 1548: James Fleming, 4th Lord Fleming
- 1562: Robert Anstruther
- 1565-72: John Fleming, 5th Lord Fleming
- 1620: John Stewart of Methven
- 1633: Sir John Maxwell, 1st Baronet, of Pollok
- 1673: John Fleming, 4th Earl of Wigtown
- 1696: Francis Montgomerie
- 1715: William Cunningham, 12th Earl of Glencairn
- 1764: Archibald Montgomerie, 11th Earl of Eglinton
- 1782: Sir Charles Grey
- 1797: Gerard Lake, 1st Viscount Lake
- 1807: William Loftus
- 1810: Andrew John Drummond
- 30 January 1817: Francis Dundas
- 5 February 1824: George Harris, 1st Baron Harris
- 22 May 1829: Thomas Graham, 1st Baron Lynedoch

=== Lieutenant-Governors ===
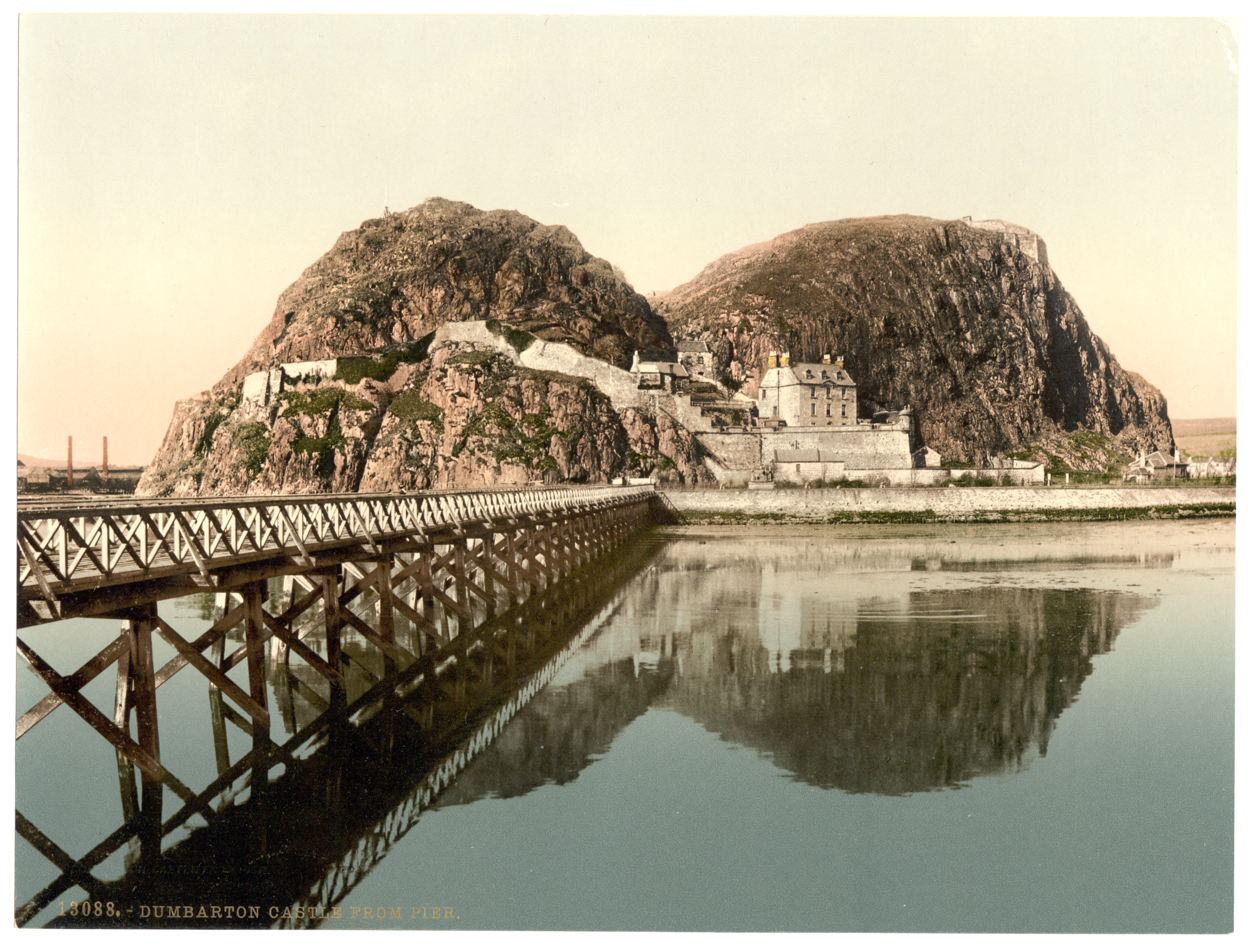
Photochrome print of the Castle and pier, 1890–1900

- 1756: Charles Hubert Herriot
- Campbell Edmonstone
- 1796: Hay Ferrier
- 1799: Samuel Graham
- Ferrier again?
- 15 April 1824: John Vincent

=== Keepers ===
- 1288 William Fleming (Constable)
- 1425 Sir John Colquhoun, 10th of Luss
- 1497 Sir John Striveling (Stirling) of Craigbernard
- 1510 William Striveling (Stirling) 1st of Glorat – murdered on Good Friday 1534)
- 1534 George Striveling (Stirling) 2nd of Glorat
- 1644: John Semple
- 22 December 1927: Sir George Murray Home Stirling, 9th Baronet of Glorat
- James Steele
- 4 July 1949: Alexander Patrick Drummond Telfer-Smollett
- 9 May 1955: Sir Angus Edward Malise Bontine Cunninghame Graham
- 12 June 1981: Alastair Stevenson Pearson
- 10 September 1996: Donald David Graeme Hardie

== Preservation ==
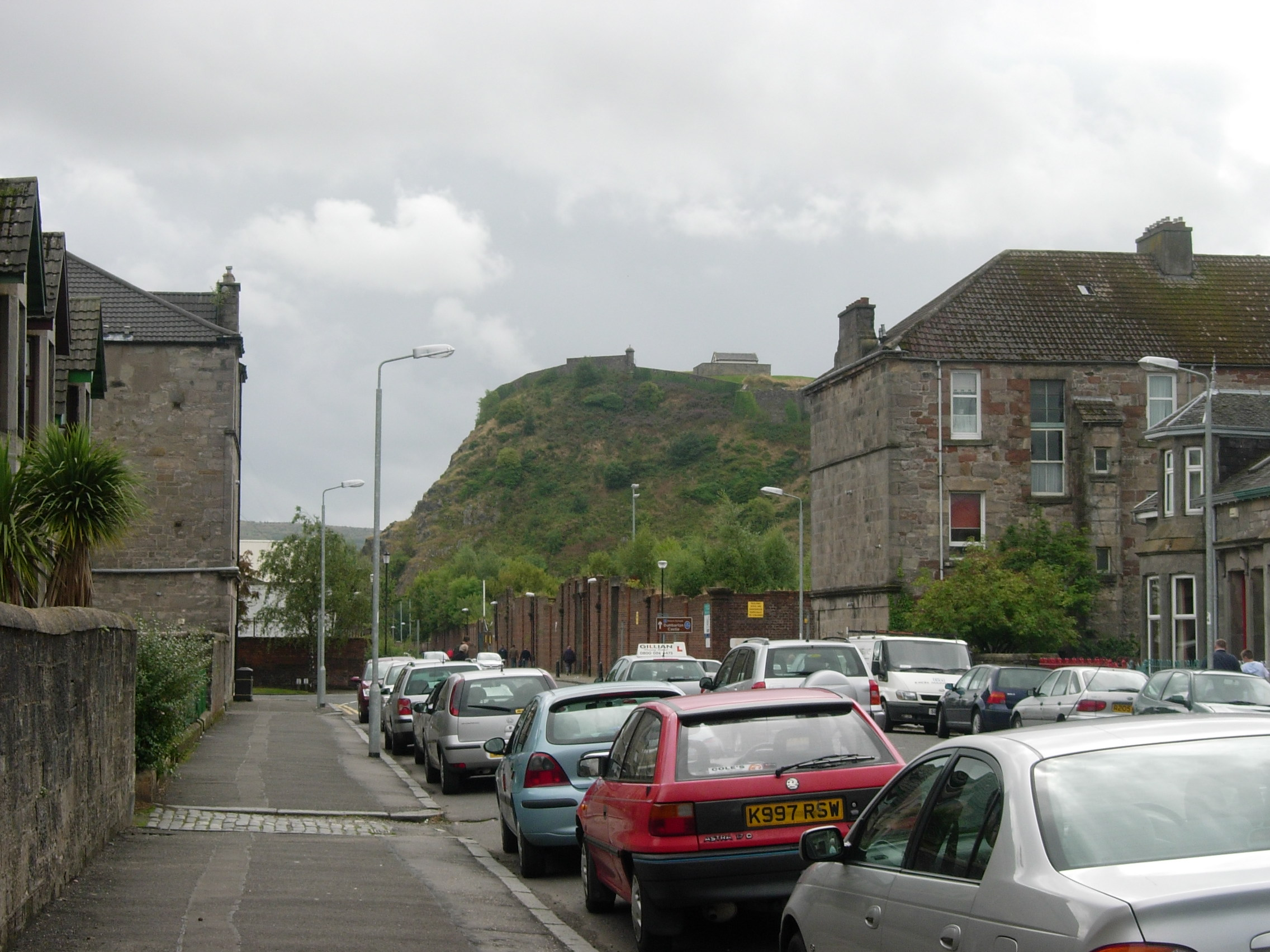
The Rock dominates much of the skyline in southern Dumbarton

Today all visible traces of the Dark-Age Alt Clut, its buildings and defences, have gone. Not much survives from the medieval castle: the 14th-century Portcullis Arch, the foundations of the Wallace Tower, and what may be the foundations of the White Tower. There is a 16th-century guard house, which includes a face which according to legend is "Fause Menteith", who betrayed William Wallace.

Most of the existing structures were built in the 18th century, including the Governor's House, built for John Kennedy, 8th Earl of Cassilis, and fortifications which demonstrate the struggle by military engineers to adapt an intractable site to contemporary defensive needs. The castle is open on a daily basis during the summer season and Saturday-Wednesday in the winter. There are 627 steps to the summit of the White Tower Crag, which has a good view of the area.

Dumbarton Rock is in state ownership and is legally protected by the Scottish Government as a scheduled monument.

== Geodesy ==
Up to 1919 Dumbarton Rock was the origin (meridian) of the 6 inch and 1:2500 Ordnance Survey maps for Dumbartonshire. After that the maps for Dumbartonshire were drawn according to the meridian of Lanark Church Spire in Lanarkshire.

== In popular culture ==
In 1803 Dorothy and William Wordsworth visited the castle and were told that a ruin on the top of the highest eminence had been a windmill and were shown a trout, boxed up in a well close by to the guard room, that had been there for thirty years. The castle features in the 1810 historical novel The Scottish Chiefs by Jane Porter.
