= John Fleming, 2nd Lord Fleming =

Scottish nobleman

John Fleming, 2nd Lord Fleming (c. 1465 – 1 November 1524) was a Scottish nobleman.

== Biography ==
He was the son of Malcolm Fleming, 1st Lord Fleming, and Euphame Livingstone, a daughter of James Livingston, 1st Lord Livingston. In 1514, he was one of the lords charged with the care of the infant James V and his younger brother, Alexander Stewart, Duke of Ross. He served as Lord Chamberlain of Scotland from 1517 until his resignation on 1 August 1524. In the spring of 1522 he and Lord Hay, the king's secretary, visited France on a diplomatic mission.

Lord Fleming was assassinated on 1 November 1524 by John Tweedie of Drumelzier and his followers.

== Personal life ==
John Fleming was married three times:

His first wife was Eupheme Drummond (1470–1502), daughter of John Drummond, 1st Lord Drummond. They had:

- Malcolm Fleming, 3rd Lord Fleming (1494–1547)

His second wife was Lady Margaret Stewart (b. 1495), daughter of Matthew Stewart, 2nd Earl of Lennox. They had:

- Margaret Fleming (1509–1542), married Patrick Murray, of Falahill, Laird of Philiphaugh

His third wife was Agnes Somerville, of Cambusnethan (d. 1543), daughter of Sir John Somerville (1457–1513). They had:

- Margaret Fleming, married John Cunningham, of Glengarnock (d. 1601)

Peerage of Scotland
Preceded by Malcolm Fleming	Lord Fleming; 1477–1524	Succeeded by Malcolm Fleming
