= Henri d'Angoulême =

French military commander (1551–1586)

Henri
- Duke of Angoulême
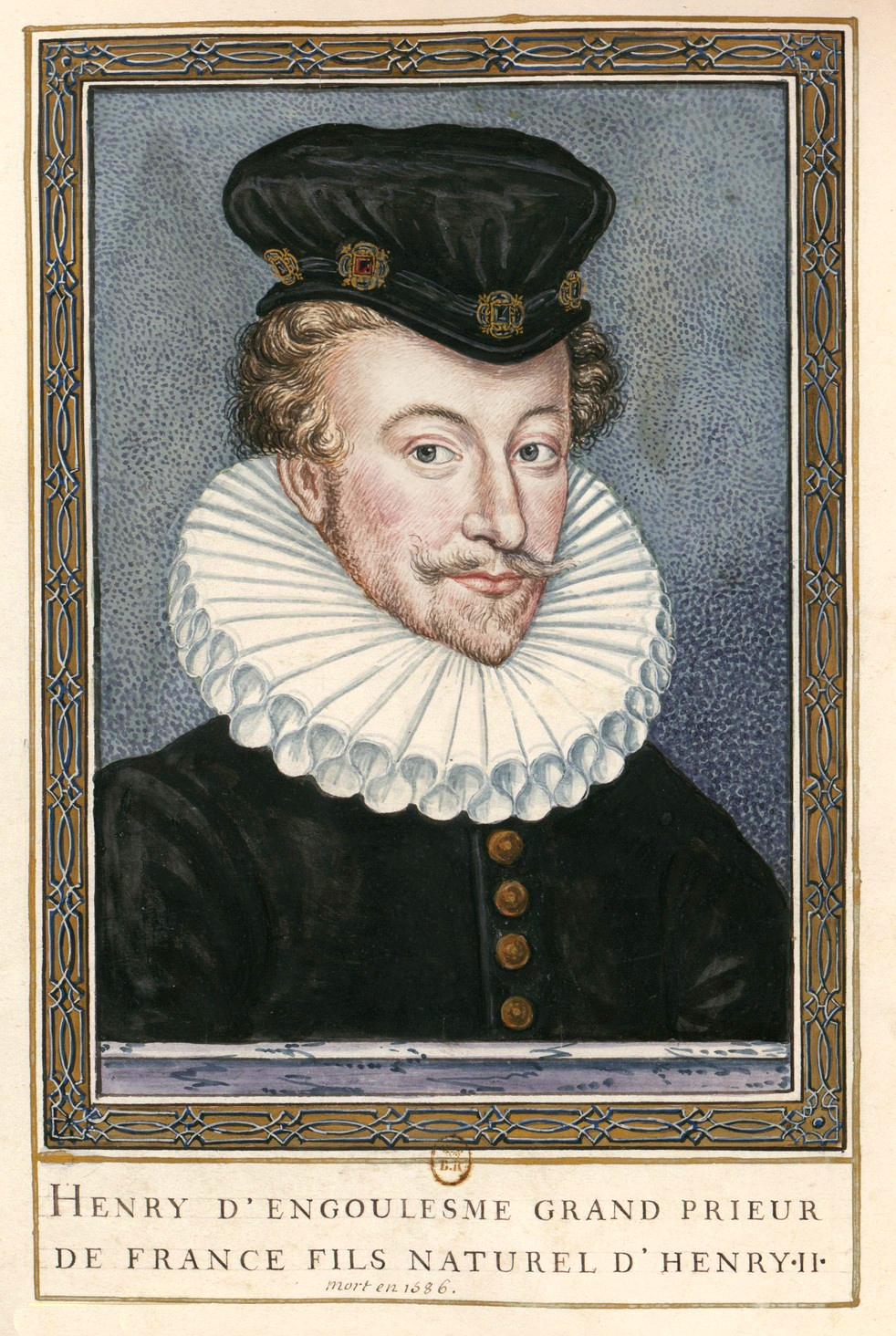
- Portrait engraving of Henri d'Angoulême
- Born: 1551
- Died: 2 June 1586 (aged 34-35); Aix-en-Provence, France
Names
- Henri de Valois
- House: Valois-Angoulême
- Father: Henri II of France
- Mother: Janet Stewart
- Religion: Roman Catholicism

Henri de Valois, duc d'Angoulême (1551 – 2 June 1586, in Aix-en-Provence), sometimes called "Henri, bâtard de Valois" or "Henri de France", was a Légitimé de France, cleric, and military commander during the Wars of Religion.

== Biography ==
Born in 1551, Henri was the illegitimate son of Henry II of France and his mistress Janet Stewart, Lady Fleming, an illegitimate daughter of James IV of Scotland. Being the most highly favored natural son of the King, he was legitimized and made Duke of Angoulême. Henri would later serve as Abbot of La Chaise-Dieu, Grand Prior of France of the Sovereign Order of Malta and Admiral of the Levantine Sea, further ruling as Governor of Provence from 1579 until his death in 1586.

In 1570, Henri was chosen, by the supporters of Mary, Queen of Scots, as a potential leader of a French military force to aid them in their civil war against the supporters James VI of Scotland. They thought that Henri's Scottish and French royal ancestry would gain him respect in Scotland and England. Although the Queen's supporters put the idea to John Lesley, Queen Mary's ambassador in France, French soldiers and Henri were not sent to Scotland.

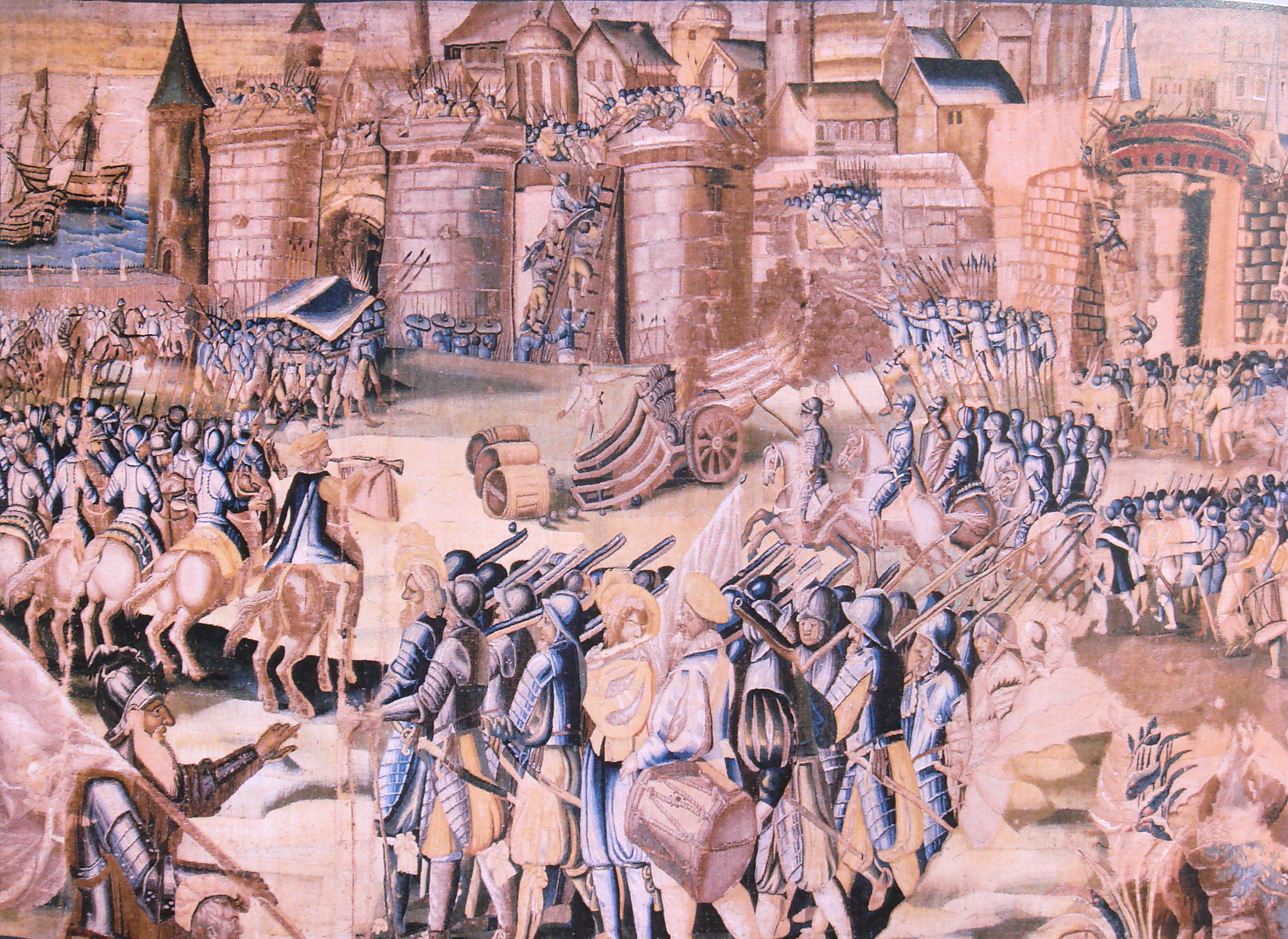
Tapestry detailing the Siege of La Rochelle (1572–1573)

Henri took a major role in the two extended military battles against Huguenot strongholds during the height of the French Wars of Religion, engaging in the massive Siege of La Rochelle (1572–1573), organized by the Duke of Anjou, future king Henry III of France, and leading the five-year Siege of Ménerbes (1573–1578).

While serving as Governor of Provence, his secretary was the poet François de Malherbe. Henri wrote many sonnets, one of which was set to music by Fabrice Caietain.

== Death ==
In 1586, Henri was killed at Aix-en-Provence in a duel with Philip Altoviti, who also was mortally wounded in the fight.

== Sources ==
- Brooks, Jeanice (2000). Courtly song in late sixteenth-century France. The University of Chicago Press.
- Cameron, Annie, ed. (1931). Warrender Papers. Vol. 1. T. and A. Constable Ltd.
- Joseph, George; Green, Maria (2004). Rubin, David Lee (ed.). La Poésie Française du Premier 17e siècle: Textes et Contextes: "François Malherbe" (in French). Rookwood Press, Inc.
- Kelly, Blanche M. (1913). "Francois Malherbe". In Herbermann, Charles George; Pace, Edward Aloysius (eds.). The Catholic Encyclopedia. Vol. 9. The Encyclopedia Press, Inc.
- Sealy, Robert J. (1981). The Palace Academy of Henry III. Droz.
- Micaleff, Fabrice (2018). Le batard royal:Henri d'Angouleme dans l'ombre des Valois (1551-1586) (in French). Droz. ISBN 978-2-600-05808-7.
