= Earl of Wigtown =

Title in the Peerage of Scotland

Earldom of Wigtown
- Quarterly: 1st and 4th, gules, a chevron within a double tressure counterflory argent (Fleming); 2nd and 3rd, Azure, three cinquefoils argent (Fraser)
- Creation date: 9 November 1341
- Created by: David II of Scotland
- Peerage: Peerage of Scotland
- First holder: Malcolm Fleming, 1st Earl of Wigtown
- Last holder: Charles Fleming, 7th Earl of Wigtown
- Subsidiary titles: Baron Galloway; Lord of Cumbernauld; Lord of Kirkintilloch; Lord Fleming
- Status: Extinct
- Seat: Tottenham House
- Motto: "Let the deed shaw"

Earl of Wigtown (Note: Alternative spellings are Wigton or Wigtoun.) was a title in the Peerage of Scotland. It was first created in 1341 for Sir Malcolm Fleming of Clan Fleming, a prominent Scottish noble. It is currently extinct.

== History ==
The earldom has been created twice, connected to the town of Wigtown, a historic trading port on the western shore of Wigtown Bay in Dumfries and Galloway, Scotland. The town's name likely derives from the Old English wic, meaning village or bay, and tun, meaning town or hill, reflecting its position on a 200-foot hill with commanding views of the surrounding area.

The earldom was surrendered in 1372 when Thomas Fleming, 2nd Earl of Wigtown, sold the earldom and its associated lands to Archibald Douglas, known as Archibald the Grim, Lord of Galloway. This transfer was confirmed by King Robert II later that year. The Douglas family, also Earls of Douglas, held the earldom for over 80 years until the attainder of James Douglas, 9th Earl of Douglas, in 1455, when the title and estates were forfeited to the Crown due to the family's opposition to King James II.

The earldom was recreated in 1606 by King James VI for John Fleming, 6th Lord Fleming. The earls of this creation held the subsidiary titles of Lord Fleming, created in 1451 and extinct in 1747, and Lord Kirkintilloch, created around 1184. John Fleming, 2nd Earl of Wigtown, was a Privy Counsellor, commissioner in the Scottish Parliament, and a staunch Royalist supporter of King Charles I during the English Civil War. His son, also John Fleming, the third Earl, was a Royalist and fought at the Battle of Philiphaugh in 1645. William Fleming, the fifth Earl, educated at Glasgow University, served as Commander of Dumbarton Castle, Sheriff of Dumbarton, and Privy Counsellor. John Fleming, 6th Earl of Wigtown, supported the House of Stuart, accompanied King James VII to France in 1689, and opposed the Treaty of Union in 1707. He was imprisoned in Edinburgh Castle during the Jacobite Rising of 1715 as a suspected sympathiser.

Upon the death of Charles Fleming, the seventh Earl, the earldom became extinct due to his dying without male heirs. A distinct earldom in the Baronage of Scotland, along with the estates, passed through the female line to Lady Clementina Fleming, daughter of the sixth Earl, who married Charles Elphinstone, 10th Lord Elphinstone. The estates remained with the Elphinstone family, and a Signature of Resignation under the Great Seal of Scotland in 1790 confirmed the earldom in favour of John Elphinstone, 11th Lord Elphinstone.

== Earls of Wigtown (1341) ==
=== Earls of Wigtown, first creation ===
- Malcolm Fleming, 1st Earl of Wigtown (d. c. 1363)
- Thomas Fleming, 2nd Earl of Wigtown (d. x 1382), title surrendered 1372

=== Douglas earls ===
- Archibald Douglas, 3rd Earl of Douglas
- Archibald Douglas, 4th Earl of Douglas
- Archibald Douglas, 5th Earl of Douglas
- William Douglas, 6th Earl of Douglas
- James Douglas, 7th Earl of Douglas
- William Douglas, 8th Earl of Douglas
- James Douglas, 9th Earl of Douglas

=== Lords Fleming (1451) ===
- Robert Fleming, 1st Lord Fleming or Malcolm Fleming, 1st Lord Fleming (d. 1494)
- John Fleming, 2nd Lord Fleming (d.1524)
- Malcolm Fleming, 3rd Lord Fleming (c.1494–1547)
- James Fleming, 4th Lord Fleming (b.1538–1558)
- John Fleming, 5th Lord Fleming (d. 1572)
- John Fleming, 6th or 7th Lord Fleming (1567–1619) became Earl of Wigtown in 1606

=== Earls of Wigtown, second creation ===
- John Fleming, 1st Earl of Wigtown (1567–1619)
- John Fleming, 2nd Earl of Wigtown (1589–1650)
- John Fleming, 3rd Earl of Wigtown (d.1665)
- John Fleming, 4th Earl of Wigtown (d.1668)
- William Fleming, 5th Earl of Wigtown (d.1681)
- John Fleming, 6th Earl of Wigtown (1673–1744)
- Charles Fleming, 7th Earl of Wigtown (1675–1747)
