= John Fleming, 5th Lord Fleming =

Scottish nobleman

John, Fifth Lord Fleming
- Born: 1536
- Died: 6 September 1572 (aged 35-36); Boghall Castle, Biggar, South Lanarkshire, Scotland

John Fleming, 5th Lord Fleming (1529 – 6 September 1572), was a Scottish nobleman and a supporter of Mary, Queen of Scots.

== Life ==
He was the son of Malcolm Fleming, 3rd Lord Fleming, lord high chamberlain, by his wife Johanna or Jonet Stewart, natural daughter of James IV. He succeeded his brother James Fleming, 4th Lord Fleming, who had died in Paris on 15 December 1558 in the twenty-fourth year of his age (therefore b. ca 1534). From this, we can estimate that John Fleming, being a younger brother of James, was probably born ca 1536.

He was Governor of Dumbarton Castle in 1565, and was made Chamberlain and Master Usher of the Chamber Doors to Mary and Lord Darnley on 28 July 1565. He supported Mary, Queen of Scots, fighting for her at the Battles of Carberry Hill and Langside. He accompanied her on her flight to England in 1568. Mary sent Fleming to France to ask for the support of Charles IX and to prevent sales of her jewels there. He returned to Scotland in 1569. During the Marian Civil War he held Dumbarton Castle for the Queen.

While John was defending Dumbarton Castle against the supporters of James VI in 1570 in the cause of Mary, Queen of Scots, his young family was harassed at his houses at Biggar and Cumbernauld Castle by Regent Lennox's men. It was reported:

"they wald noct suffir his wyf within na boundes [expelled from her home], thre infantis with hir, the eldest of thame nocht thre yeir auld, schaiking thame furct of ther claythes and bedding most schamefullie ... and ther is twa of thame can noct speik."
"they would not suffer his wife within any bounds, three infants with her, the eldest of them not yet three years old, shaking them out of their clothes and bedding most shamefully ... and two of them cannot speak yet."

As well as the farm livestock, the King's men took his deer and wild white cattle of Cumbernauld for Lennox's table in Edinburgh.

When Dumbarton fell on 1 April 1571, Lord Fleming escaped to France. Lady Fleming was left behind in Scotland and Regent Lennox allowed her to keep her goods and some of her landed income.

In 1572 Fleming again returned to Scotland, landing at Blackness Castle with money to pay Marian troops. Shortly after joining William Kirkcaldy of Grange, who still held Edinburgh Castle for Mary, Fleming was wounded in the knee by a musket ball which had ricocheted after being fired by a French soldier. When the wound became infected, he was carried in a litter to Boghall Castle in Biggar, where he died two months later.

== Family ==
Fleming married on 10 May 1562, Elizabeth Ross (died after 14 April 1578), only child of Robert, Master of Ross, son of Ninian, Lord Ross, by his wife Agnes Scott. Elizabeth was a lady in waiting to Mary, Queen of Scots and she paid for the wedding banquet and a gown of silk taffeta with gold trimmings for the bride. The celebrations were held in Holyrood Park at the side of the loch and there were "great triumphs", shows and masques involving a staged sea-battle or naumachia said by Robert Lindsay of Pitscottie to represent the "figure" of the siege of Leith. The Earl of Wismar ambassador from Sweden attended.

They had the following children:

- John Fleming, later 6th Lord Fleming later 1st Earl of Wigtown
- Margaret Fleming, married after 19 April 1588, Sir James Forrester of Garden
- Elizabeth Fleming (died after 24 September 1579)
- Jane Fleming (died October 1630), married after 1582/3 William Bruce of Airth
- Mary Fleming, married after 9 December 1581, Sir James Douglas, 8th of Drumlanrig, and had issue.

Lord Fleming also had a daughter with an unknown mother, Lucrece Fleming, who married firstly, John Stewart of Rosland, a royal valet, and secondly, at Stirling on 4 August 1593, Robert Graham of the Fauld, an English borderer who died in 1600.

An inventory of goods at Boghall Castle was made in October 1578 after the death of Elizabeth Ross, Lady Fleming. It includes her beds, riding clothes, and her wedding dress. Some items of jewellery were in the hands of an Edinburgh goldsmith Michael Gilbert.

== Notes ==
Peerage of Scotland
Preceded by James Fleming	Lords Fleming; 1558–1572	Succeeded by John Fleming
Political offices
Preceded by 4th Lord Fleming	Great Chamberlain; 1565–1572	Succeeded by 1st Duke of Lennox
