= James Fleming, 4th Lord Fleming =

Lord Chamberlain of Scotland

James, Fourth Lord Fleming
- Born: Approx 1534
- Died: 18 December 1558; Paris, Kingdom of France

James Fleming, 4th Lord Fleming (approx 1534–18 December 1558) was Lord Chamberlain of Scotland. His death in France after making arrangements for the marriage of Mary, Queen of Scots was regarded as suspicious by contemporaries.

== Life ==
He was the eldest son of Malcolm Fleming, 3rd Lord Fleming, Lord High Chamberlain, and Johanna or Jonet Stewart, natural daughter of James IV. He died in Paris on 15 December 1558 in the twenty-fourth year of his age. From this, his birth year was ca 1534. Malcolm Fleming, who had been taken prisoner at the battle of Solway Moss in 1542, and had been tried and acquitted of treason in 1545 for his connection with the English party, was slain at the battle of Pinkie 10 September 1547.

In August 1548, the young new Lord Fleming, along with Lord Erskine, accompanied Queen Mary to France, and his mother was appointed her governess. James Fleming was an English prisoner by May 1549, and was released by exchange with the English prisoner James Wilford. In 1550 James accompanied the queen dowager Mary of Guise into France .

On 21 December 1553, James was confirmed as Great Chamberlain of Scotland for life. About the same time, he was appointed guardian of the East and Middle Marches, and invested with power of justiciary within his jurisdictions.

James Fleming was one of the eight commissioners elected by parliament 8 December 1557, to represent the Scottish nation at the nuptials of Queen Mary with Francis, dauphin of France, on 24 April 1558. Though the commissioners agreed to swear fealty to the King-Dauphin as the husband of the queen, they affirmed that their instructions did not permit them to agree that he should receive the Scottish ensigns of royalty.

They were thereupon requested to support this proposal in the Scottish parliament, but when they left for Scotland, the French court appears to have been doubtful of the intentions of certain members of the commission. In such circumstances, the death of James and three of the other commissioners on the way home awakened grave suspicions that they had been designedly poisoned. The Earls of Rothes and Cassilis and Bishop Reid of Orkney succumbed sooner to the attack than Fleming, who, in the hope of recovery, returned to Paris, but died there on 18 December 1558, at age 24.

== Family ==
By his marriage to Lady Barbara Hamilton, eldest daughter of James Hamilton, Duke of Châtellerault, Fleming had one daughter, Jean Fleming. She was married firstly to John Maitland, 1st Lord Maitland of Thirlestane, who died 3 October 1595, by whom she had a son and a daughter; and secondly to John Kennedy, 5th Earl of Cassilis, by whom she had no issue.

== Notes ==
Peerage of Scotland
Preceded by Malcolm Fleming	Lords Fleming; 1547–1558	Succeeded by John Fleming
Political offices
Preceded by 3rd Lord Fleming	Great Chamberlain; 1547–1558	Succeeded by 5th Lord Fleming
