= James Hamilton, 1st Lord Hamilton =

Scottish nobleman, scholar and politician (c. 1415–1479)

James Hamilton
- 1st Lord Hamilton
- Arms of Hamilton
- Predecessor: New creation
- Successor: James Hamilton, 1st Earl of Arran, 2nd Lord Hamilton
- Born: c. 1415; Cadzow Castle
- Died: 6 November 1479
- Noble family: Hamilton
- Spouses: Lady Euphemia Graham (m. 1440; died 1468) Mary Stewart of Scotland (m. 1472)
- Father: James Hamilton of Cadzow
- Mother: Janet Livingston

James Hamilton, 1st Lord Hamilton, 6th Laird of Cadzow (c. 1415 – 6 November 1479) was a Scottish nobleman, scholar and politician.

== Early life ==
James Hamilton was the son of James Hamilton of Cadzow, 5th Laird of Cadzow. He was born at Cadzow Castle, Lanarkshire. He first appears on record on a charter of 1426, granting him the rights to the lands of Dalserf, which had been alienated by his father.

=== Douglas connection ===
Hamilton was intimately connected with the powerful House of Douglas: his paternal grandmother was a daughter of James Douglas Lord of Dalkeith d. 1441, and also through his marriage in 1439/1440 with Lady Euphemia Graham, the youthful widow of Archibald Douglas, 5th Earl of Douglas and daughter of Euphemia Stewart, Countess of Strathearn. Hamilton became stepfather to the young 6th Earl of Douglas, William Douglas, and his brother David, who would both be murdered in November 1440 at the 'Black Dinner' at Edinburgh Castle in the presence of James II. Furthermore, he was the stepfather of Margaret Douglas, known as the "Fair Maid of Galloway", who was to marry her cousins William Douglas, 8th Earl of Douglas, and James Douglas, 9th Earl of Douglas.

== Laird o' Cadzow to Lord Hamilton ==
Prior to 1440 he achieved the status of knighthood, and c. 1440/1441 he inherited his father's estates. In 1445, Hamilton received letters patent creating him a Lord of Parliament. This charter raised all his estates into the entail of that rank, with its Capital Messuage at the Orchard, (later Hamilton Palace), at Cadzow. Furthermore, the charter stated that henceforth the lands would be known as Hamilton as they are today.

Hamilton accompanied his stepson in law, the 8th Earl of Douglas, to Rome in 1450, and there obtained permission from the Holy See to convert the Parish Church at the new burgh of Hamilton into a Collegiate Establishment, with endowments for a Provost and six Canons.

=== Royal displeasure ===
He was certainly with the 9th Earl of Douglas, a month after the murder when the 9th Earl burned the town of Stirling. There followed open warfare in which King James II attacked Douglas lands. An agreement was reached between the King and the Douglas faction at Douglas Castle, in August 1452 that was to last until 1455 in which the Douglas forgave the King's killing of his brother. In 1453, Hamilton was in England, again with the 9th Earl of Douglas, arranging the release of his brother in law, Malise Graham, Earl of Strathearn. For this action Strathearn granted Hamilton the lands of Elliestoun in Linlithgowshire. Hamilton was again in London the following year negotiating a treasonous bond in which Douglas was to swear fealty to King Henry VI in return for support against King James, but the negotiations came to nothing. He was back in Scotland by February 1455 at which time Hamilton and the Earl of Douglas's brothers ravaged and burned much of Lanarkshire.

==== Siege of Abercorn and fall of the Black Douglas ====
In March 1455, King James took to the field against Douglas, sacking his properties and burning his crops. Hamilton's lands, he being a partisan of the Douglases, were also particularly devastated. King James then besieged the Douglas stronghold of Abercorn Castle, using cannons to destroy it. Douglas mustered his men from Douglasdale, Galloway and the Forest; Hamilton, his levies from Clydesdale. The troops marched to raise the siege, but the Earl of Douglas' indecision on a plan of attack is said to have perplexed Hamilton, and cause him to withdraw his support for the Douglas cause. Hamilton changed sides and became a partisan of the Royal party. There is evidence to suggest that Hamilton's uncle, James Livingstone, 1st Lord Livingston had a part in this change of heart. Douglas fled to England, his Castle of Abercorn was slighted, two of his brothers died at and following the Battle of Arkinholm; finally Douglas' great fortalice of Threave Castle fell and Douglas was attainted, all his enormous patrimony forfeit.

=== Return to Favour ===
Following the collapse of the Douglas rebellion, Hamilton was warded at Roslin Castle, in Midlothian for a short while. As recompense for his Volte-Face, Hamilton was created Sheriff of Lanark, in July 1455, and certain of the Earl of Douglas' forfeited lands were made over to him. These, and his existing lands, being confirmed in Royal charters of October that year. The Barony of Hamilton was increased to include the lands of Drumsergard, Cessford, Kinneil etc., and carefully entailed to whosoever might bear the name and Chief arms of Hamilton. Hamilton was made Bailie of the Priory of Lesmahagow, a Douglas foundation, and was granted the privilege of the lands of Finnart. Hamilton's new patron was the new Lord of Douglas, George Douglas, 4th Earl of Angus, the head of the "Red line" of the House of Douglas, and a supporter of the King.

== Marriage and Issue ==
Hamilton first married, Lady Euphemia Graham, in 1440 (died 1468), daughter of Patrick Graham, de jure Earl of Strathearn and Euphemia Stewart, Countess of Strathearn and widow of Archibald Douglas, 5th Earl of Douglas. They had a daughter:

- Elizabeth Hamilton (c. 1442 – c. 1517), who married David Lindsay, 1st Duke of Montrose

He married secondly, Mary, daughter of King James II and widow of Thomas Boyd, Earl of Arran. With Mary, Hamilton had three children:

- Elizabeth Hamilton, Countess of Lennox, who married Matthew Stewart, 2nd Earl of Lennox. Her descendants included James I of England & VI of Scotland.
- James Hamilton, 1st Earl of Arran (c. 1475–1529)

Illegitimate children included Sir Patrick Hamilton of Kincavil, father of Master Patrick Hamilton, burnt for heresy in 1528 and a Protestant martyr. Lord Hamilton also had a daughter who married Sir John MacFarlane, 11th chief of Clan MacFarlane. John Hamilton of Broomhill (d. c. 1550), another illegitimate child of James, 1st Lord Hamilton, was by Janet Calderwood. In 1512 John's birth was legitimised. His grandson, James Hamilton, notably served as Sheriff of Perthshire, and his descendants became the Lords Belhaven and Stenton. Another illegitimate child by Janet Calderwood was David Hamilton, Bishop of Argyll and commendator of Dryburgh Abbey.

== Ancestry ==
Ancestors of James Hamilton, 1st Lord Hamilton

16. David fitz Walter of Cadzow
8. David Hamilton of Cadzow
17. Margaret Leslie
4. John Hamilton of Cadzow
18. William Keith of Galston
9. Jonetta Keith
2. James Hamilton of Cadzow
20. Sir John Douglas of Lothian
10. Sir James Douglas of Dalkeith
21. Agnes de Graham
5. Janet Douglas
22. Sir Patrick (V) of Dunbar
11. Agnes Dunbar
23. Isabella Randolph
1. James Hamilton
24. Sir William Livingston
12. John Livingston of Callendar
6. Alexander Livingston of Callendar
26. Sir John Menteith of Kerse
13. Marjorie Menteith
27. Marjorie Stirling
3. Janet Livingston
28. John de Dundas
14. James Dundas of Dundas
29. Joan Douglas
7. Janet Dundas
30. John Stewart of Innermeath
15. Christian Stewart
31. Isabel Macdougall

Peerage of Scotland
New title	Lord Hamilton; 1445–1479	Succeeded by James Hamilton
