= James Hamilton, 1st Earl of Arran =

Scottish nobleman (1475–1529)

James Hamilton
- Earl of Arran, 2nd Lord Hamilton
- Arms of James Hamilton, as Earl of Arran
- Predecessor: New creation
- Successor: James Hamilton, 2nd Earl of Arran
- Born: c. 1475
- Died: 1529; Kinneil House, West Lothian
- Buried: Hamilton, South Lanarkshire
- Noble family: Hamilton
- Spouses: 1st Elizabeth Home; 2nd Janet Bethune of Creich
- Issue: Helen Hamilton; James Hamilton, 2nd Earl of Arran; Janet Hamilton; Elizabeth Hamilton (illegitimate); Margaret Hamilton (illegitimate); James Hamilton of Finnart (illegitimate)
- Father: James Hamilton, 1st Lord Hamilton
- Mother: Mary Stewart, Countess of Arran

James Hamilton, 1st Earl of Arran and 2nd Lord Hamilton (c. 1475 – 1529) was a Scottish nobleman, naval commander and first cousin of James IV of Scotland. He also served as the 9th Lord High Admiral of Scotland.

== Early life ==
He was the elder of two sons of James Hamilton, 1st Lord Hamilton, and his wife, Mary Stewart, Countess of Arran. Mary was a daughter of King James II of Scotland and his Queen consort Mary of Guelders, and a sister of King James III of Scotland.

Hamilton succeeded to his father's lordship, inheriting his lands when his father died in 1479. In 1489 his first cousin King James IV made him Sheriff of Lanark, a position his father had previously held, and a Scottish Privy Counsellor. By 28 April 1490 he was married to Elizabeth Home, daughter of Alexander Home, 2nd Lord Home.

== Naval career ==
Between April and August 1502, Hamilton commanded a naval fleet sent to help King Hans of Denmark, James IV's uncle, defeat a Swedish-Norwegian rebellion. He negotiated James's marriage to Margaret Tudor and was present at the wedding on 8 August 1503. On the same day Lord Hamilton was created Earl of Arran, with the formal grant three days later, "for his nearness of blood" and his services at the time of the marriage. He was appointed Lieutenant General of Scotland and in May 1504 commanded a naval expedition to suppress an uprising in the Western Isles.

In September 1507, James IV sent Hamilton as his ambassador on a diplomatic mission to the court of Louis XII of France. When returning in early 1508, he was briefly detained in the Kingdom of England by Henry VII, who was suspicious of a renewal of the Auld Alliance between Scotland and France.

When Henry VIII of England joined the War of the League of Cambrai by invading France in 1513, Scotland came under pressure to support France against England. Hamilton was given command of the Scottish naval fleet. He first sailed to Ulster and attacked Carrickfergus, the main English stronghold there. The fleet then sailed to France, arriving there in September 1513, too late to be much help as the Scottish army had been defeated at the Battle of Flodden in England on 9 September, with James IV being killed in battle. Arran returned to Scotland in November 1513.

== Politician ==
During the minority of King James V, Hamilton opposed Archibald Douglas, 6th Earl of Angus and the English party. He plotted against the Regent John Stewart, 2nd Duke of Albany, and was president of the council of regency during Albany's absence in France from 1517 to 1520. The same year he led an expedition to the border to punish the murderers of the French knight Antoine d'Arces ("De la Bastie").

He was defeated in an attempt to overpower Angus in the streets of Edinburgh in April 1520, a riot known as "Cleanse the Causeway". Arran's half-brother, Patrick Hamilton of Kincavil, was killed. Arran was again a member of the council of regency in 1522 and Lieutenant of the South. He joined the Queen Dowager Margaret Tudor in ousting Albany and proclaiming James V in 1524.

In the same year, Hamilton was compelled by Henry VIII of England to readmit Angus to the council. At the Parliament in February 1525, Angus carried the crown of Scotland, Arran carried the sceptre, and Argyll carried the sword of state. Arran supported Angus against John Stewart, 3rd Earl of Lennox in 1526 at the Battle of Linlithgow Bridge, but on the escape of James V from the Douglases, Hamilton received Bothwell from Angus's forfeited estates.

== Marriage and children ==
James Hamilton was married firstly, around 1490, to Elizabeth Home, daughter of Alexander Home, 2nd Lord Home by his second wife, Nichola Ker. The marriage was dissolved in 1506, when it was found that her first husband Thomas Hay, a son of John Hay, 1st Lord Hay of Yester, was still alive at the time of the wedding.

In November 1504, Hamilton had been granted a divorce from Elizabeth Home on the grounds that she had previously been married to Thomas Hay. Hay had apparently left the country and was thought to be dead when Hamilton married Home, in or before 1490, but in fact he did not die until 1491 or later. This award of divorce was repeated in 1510, suggesting that Hamilton had continued living with her, after 1504, and was held by some to undermine the dissolution of the first marriage as invalid. It is likely that the real motive for divorcing Elizabeth was that she had not born any children, and that Hamilton wanted a legitimate heir; he already had several illegitimate children, his eldest illegitimate son being James Hamilton of Finnart. The complicated legal issues of the first marriage would continue to trouble his heir, whose legitimacy was questioned by his rivals in 1543.

Hamilton was married secondly, in November 1516, to Janet Bethune, daughter of Sir David Betoun of Creich, and widow of Sir Robert Livingstone of Easter Wemyss, who had been killed at the Battle of Flodden. Arran and Janet Bethune had at least four children:

- Lady Helen Hamilton, who married Archibald Campbell, 4th Earl of Argyll.
- James Hamilton, 2nd Earl of Arran, who later became Duke of Châtelherault and governor of Scotland, during the minority of Mary, Queen of Scots.
- Lady Janet Hamilton, who married Alexander Cunningham, 5th Earl of Glencairn.
- A son, name unknown.

Hamilton had further illegitimate issue.

- James Hamilton of Finnart
- Elizabeth Hamilton, who married Thomas of Kirkton Weir (born c. 1570).
- John Hamilton, Archbishop of St Andrews and treasurer of Scotland.

Children of James Hamilton and his mistress, Beatrix Drummond, daughter of John Drummond, 1st Lord Drummond and Lady Elizabeth Lindsay:

- Margaret Hamilton, who married Andrew Stewart, 2nd Lord Avondale and 1st Lord Ochiltree.
- Sir John Hamilton of Samuelston (aka Clydesdale John), who married Janet Home, only legitimate daughter and heiress of Alexander Home, 3rd Lord Home and Lady Agnes Stewart.

== Ancestors ==
Ancestors of James Hamilton, 1st Earl of Arran

John Hamilton of Cadzow
James Hamilton of Cadzow
Janet Douglas
James Hamilton, 1st Lord Hamilton
Alexander Livingston of Callendar
Janet Livingston
Janet Dundas
James Hamilton, 1st Earl of Arran
James I of Scotland
James II of Scotland
Joan Beaufort, Queen of Scots
Mary Stewart
Arnold, Duke of Guelders
Mary of Guelders
Catherine of Cleves

Peerage of Scotland
New title	Earl of Arran; 1503–1529	Succeeded by James Hamilton
Preceded by James Hamilton	Lord Hamilton; 1479–1529	Succeeded by James Hamilton
Military offices
Preceded by Patrick Hepburn	Lord High Admiral of Scotland	Succeeded by Archibald Douglas
