= James Hamilton, Duke of Châtellerault =

Regent of Scotland from 1543 to 1554

James Hamilton
- 1st Duke of Châtellerault; 2nd Earl of Arran
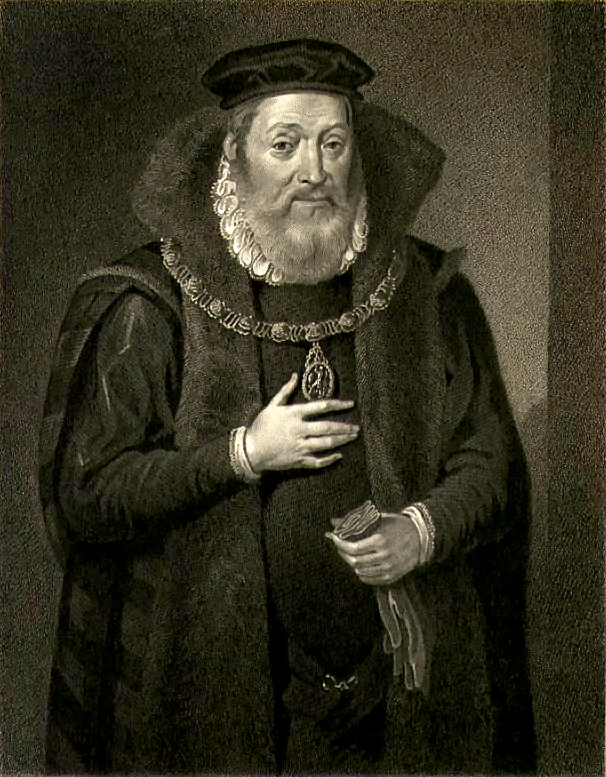
- The Duke of Châtellerault wearing the collar of the Order of St Michael
- Tenure: 1529–1575
- Predecessor: James, 1st Earl of Arran
- Successor: James, 3rd Earl of Arran
- Born: c. 1519
- Died: 22 January 1575; Hamilton Castle, Lanarkshire, Scotland
- Spouse: Margaret Douglas
- Issue Detail: James, John, Claud, Anne & others
- Father: James, 1st Earl of Arran
- Mother: Janet Bethune

James Hamilton, 1st Duke of Châtellerault, 2nd Earl of Arran (c. 1519 – 22 January 1575), was a Scottish nobleman and Regent of Scotland during the minority of Mary, Queen of Scots, from 1543 to 1554. At first pro-English and Protestant, he converted to Catholicism in 1543 and supported a pro-French policy. He reluctantly agreed to Mary's marriage to Francis, eldest son of King Henry II of France, and was rewarded by Henry by being made Duke of Châtellerault in 1549. During the Scottish Reformation, he joined the Protestant Lords of the Congregation to oppose the regency of Mary of Guise.

== Family ==
James Hamilton was born about 1519 in Hamilton in Lanarkshire. He was the eldest legitimate son of James Hamilton, 1st Earl of Arran, by his second wife, Janet Beaton (or Bethune). His paternal grandmother, Mary, was the eldest daughter of King James II. His father's family descended from Walter FitzGilbert, the founder of the House of Hamilton, who had received the barony of Cadzow from Robert the Bruce. His mother was the daughter of Sir David Beaton of Creich. She was the widow of Robert Livingstone of Easter Wemyss, and the second wife of the 1st Earl of Arran. They had married in 1516.

In 1529 he succeeded his father as Earl of Arran while still a minor. He was made a ward of James Hamilton of Finnart, his illegitimate elder half-brother.

=== Marriage ===
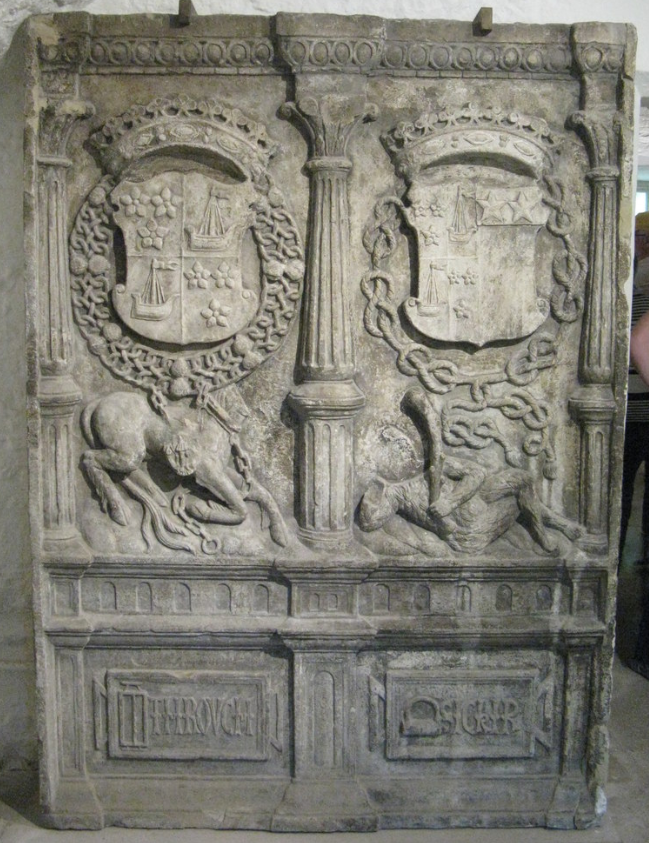
Arms of the earl of Arran (left) and his wife Margaret Douglas (right), Kinneil House

In 1532, Lord Arran married Margaret Douglas, who was about ten years older than him. She was a daughter of James Douglas, 3rd Earl of Morton, and Catherine Stewart, herself a natural daughter of James IV. The marriage was arranged by James Hamilton of Finnart. Margaret Douglas was given the house and lands of Kinneil House for her lifetime should her husband die before her. James Hamilton of Finnart paid Morton 4,000 marks as part of the marriage settlement.

James and Margaret had five sons:

1. James (1537–1609), succeeded him as the 3rd Earl of Arran but became insane in 1562;
2. Gavin, died young;
3. John (1540–1604), became the 1st Marquess of Hamilton;
4. David (died 1611);
5. Claud (1546–1621), from whom descend the earls, marquesses and dukes of Abercorn.

— and three daughters:

1. Barbara, who married Alexander, Lord Gordon in February 1549, and married secondly in 1553 James Fleming, 4th Lord Fleming.
2. Jean, married Hugh Montgomerie, 3rd Earl of Eglinton, in 1555.
3. Anne (died before April 1574), married George Gordon, 5th Earl of Huntly, in 1558.

In 1544 Arran tried to divorce his wife. She seemed to have been suffering from poor mental health. Significantly, two of their sons, James and Claud, later became insane.

An inventory of a chest of Margaret Douglas's clothes includes a purple velvet night gown with gold passementerie lined with red taffeta, a gown of black cloth of gold with gold passementerie lined with black taffeta, and other gowns and kirtles.

== Regent of Scotland ==
In 1536, on the death of John Stewart, Duke of Albany, grandson of King James II, Lord Arran, came to be next in line to the throne after the King's descendants. Several of the children of the immediate royal family proved to be short-lived, so on the death of King James V on 14 December 1542, the Earl of Arran stood next in line to the Scottish throne after the king's six-day-old daughter Mary, Queen of Scots. Arran was appointed Regent or Governor of Scotland after a meeting in Edinburgh on 3 January 1543. Arran consolidated his power base by making gifts of the late king's possessions to his supporters and kinsmen. However, in 1543, supporters of Matthew Stewart, 4th Earl of Lennox, challenged Arran's claim and legitimacy by suggesting that his father's divorce and second marriage were invalid.

=== Pro-English policy ===
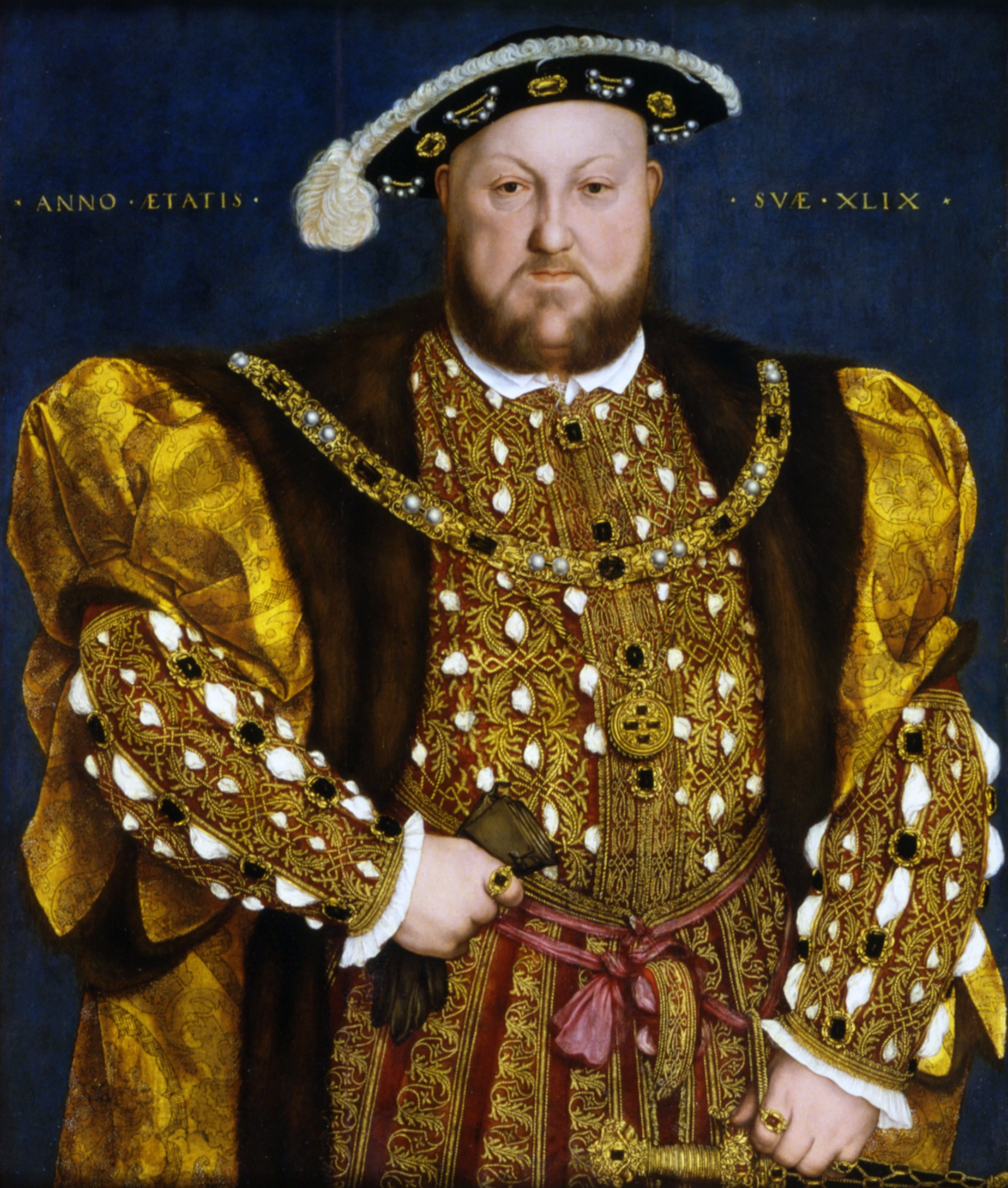
Henry VIII by Hans Holbein the Younger, 1540

Initially, Arran was a Protestant and a member of the pro-English party. In 1543 he helped to negotiate a plan for the marriage of the young Queen Mary to Edward, son of King Henry VIII of England, who had broken with Rome. In the same year, he authorised the translation and reading of the Bible in the vernacular. On 27 January 1543, he arrested Cardinal Beaton, who favoured the Auld Alliance. Beaton was imprisoned at Dalkeith Palace and then Blackness Castle. Acting on pro-English advice, in March 1543 Arran prevented Mary of Guise from moving Mary, Queen of Scots, from Linlithgow to Stirling Castle. Historians refer to this period as Arran's "Godly fit".

However, Henry VIII doubted Arran's commitment to English policy and wanted him deposed. On 18 March 1543, Arran met the English ambassador, Ralph Sadler, in the garden at Holyrood Palace. Later that day George Douglas of Pittendreich, brother of Lord Angus, told Sadler, that despite their successes:

if there be any motion now to take the Governor from his state, and to bring the government of this realm to the king of England, I assure you it is impossible to be done at this time. For, there is not so little a boy but that he will hurl stones against it, and the wives will handle their distaffs, and the commons universally will rather die in it, yea, and many noblemen and all the clergy be fully against it.

=== Pro-French policy ===
Regent Arran celebrated the Treaty of Greenwich at the Holyrood Abbey on 25 August 1543. However, in September Arran turned around. He secretly met Cardinal Beaton at Callendar House and reconciled himself with his former enemy. Shortly after he became Catholic and joined the pro-French faction. Around this time Friar Mark Hamilton wrote a history of the Hamilton family. Arran made penance for his "godly fit" at the Franciscan Friary in Stirling. Mary, Queen of Scots, was crowned at Stirling on 9 September.

Arran captured Dalkeith Castle in November 1543, but failed to capture the pro-English George Douglas. In December, the Parliament of Scotland declared the Treaty of Greenwich void due to shipping incidents. The seven-year war with England now called the Rough Wooing was declared on 20 December 1543. Arran spent Christmas with Mary of Guise at Stirling Castle where they played cards. The declaration of war was brought by Henry Ray to give to Parliament. Arran replied that the parliament was dissolved, and so he thought it expedient not to answer Henry VIII on the points raised at the time.

In 1544 an attempt was made to transfer the regency from him to Mary of Guise. A convention or Parliament of the nobility at Stirling in June suggested she should be regent instead. Conflict seemed possible, but Arran when fortified Edinburgh her forces retired. Arran held a Parliament in November 1544 and declare the resolutions of the June meeting to be of no effect. Later, in March 1545, he agreed to abandon some of his responsibilities to her and she formed an advisory council. Arran and Cardinal Beaton decided to act against the Earl of Lennox and besieged Glasgow Castle in March 1544.

In June 1547 Arran gathered a large army to expel the English from Langholm and the surrounding area. He had a banner made from taffeta decorated with gold foil and colours, and another banner for his trumpeter. Horses dragged the artillery and carts laden with cannonballs and tents out of Edinburgh Castle. The guns were dragged toward Langholm with oxen. Arran had an armoured "jack" covered with purple taffeta, then changed his mind, choosing purple velvet. A Scottish spy, David Maitland, who signed himself "Ye Wait Quha" wrote of the preparations to Thomas Wharton, that it was "the starkest host and the monest, and with the best order that wes sen Flodwn", that is, "the strongest host and most numerous, in the best order since Flodden."

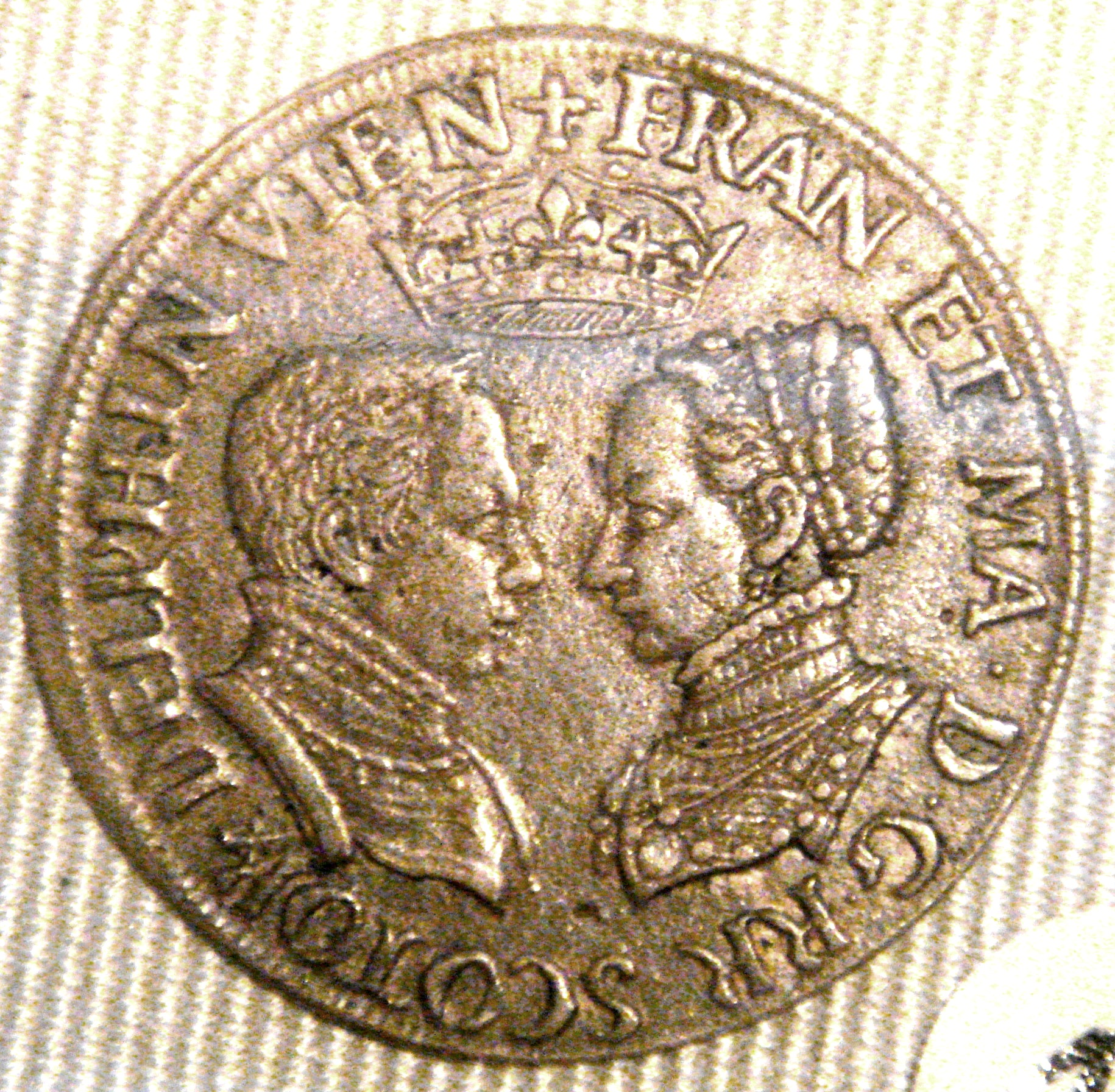
A 1558 coin depicting Queen Mary and King Francis

Edward Seymour, Duke of Somerset sent tracts into Scotland, hoping to garner support for the English cause. His agents were ordered to display his proclamation on church doors and even on the gate of Stirling Castle. On 25 August 1547, Arran gave orders that no one should read the proclamations "set forth in print in Scotland to seduce the hearts of the people to his opinion".

In September 1547, Arran assembled a large Scottish army to resist an English invasion led by the Duke of Somerset but was defeated at the battle of Pinkie. He was forced to abandon some of his clothes at the battlefield.

Arran nevertheless held onto the regency and continued to lead forces against the occupying troops. For two weeks in February 1548, he led a campaign in Teviotdale with Monsieur d'Essé to recapture Ferniehirst Castle and punish borderers. He held discussions at Jedburgh with Nicolas Durand de Villegaignon over the site and financing of a new fort.

Arran reluctantly agreed in July 1548 to Mary's marriage to Francis, eldest son of Henry II of France. Mary was sent to France. Henry II, by the Treaty of Haddington claimed to be Protector of Scotland, and rewarded Arran by making him Duke of Châtellerault on 8 February 1549 and a knight of the Order of Saint Michael.

On 19 April 1550, Regent Arran and his Privy Council made legislation about foodstuffs and rising prices. The people of Scotland were to reduce their diets and banqueting. Prices were set for wild birds and rabbits, swans would be 5 shillings, plovers 5 pence. River birds including herons and ducks were to be caught by hawking. It was forbidden to shoot deer or birds for the table with "half hag or culverin or pistolate". These acts were ratified by Parliament.

Arran came to the north of Scotland in 1552, visiting Aberdeen, Dunnotar Castle, and Huntly Castle where his daughter Barbara Hamilton lived with the family of her husband Alexander, Lord Gordon. He held "justice ayres" or courts and was accompanied by musicians, much like a Scottish monarch on progress.

== Post-regency ==
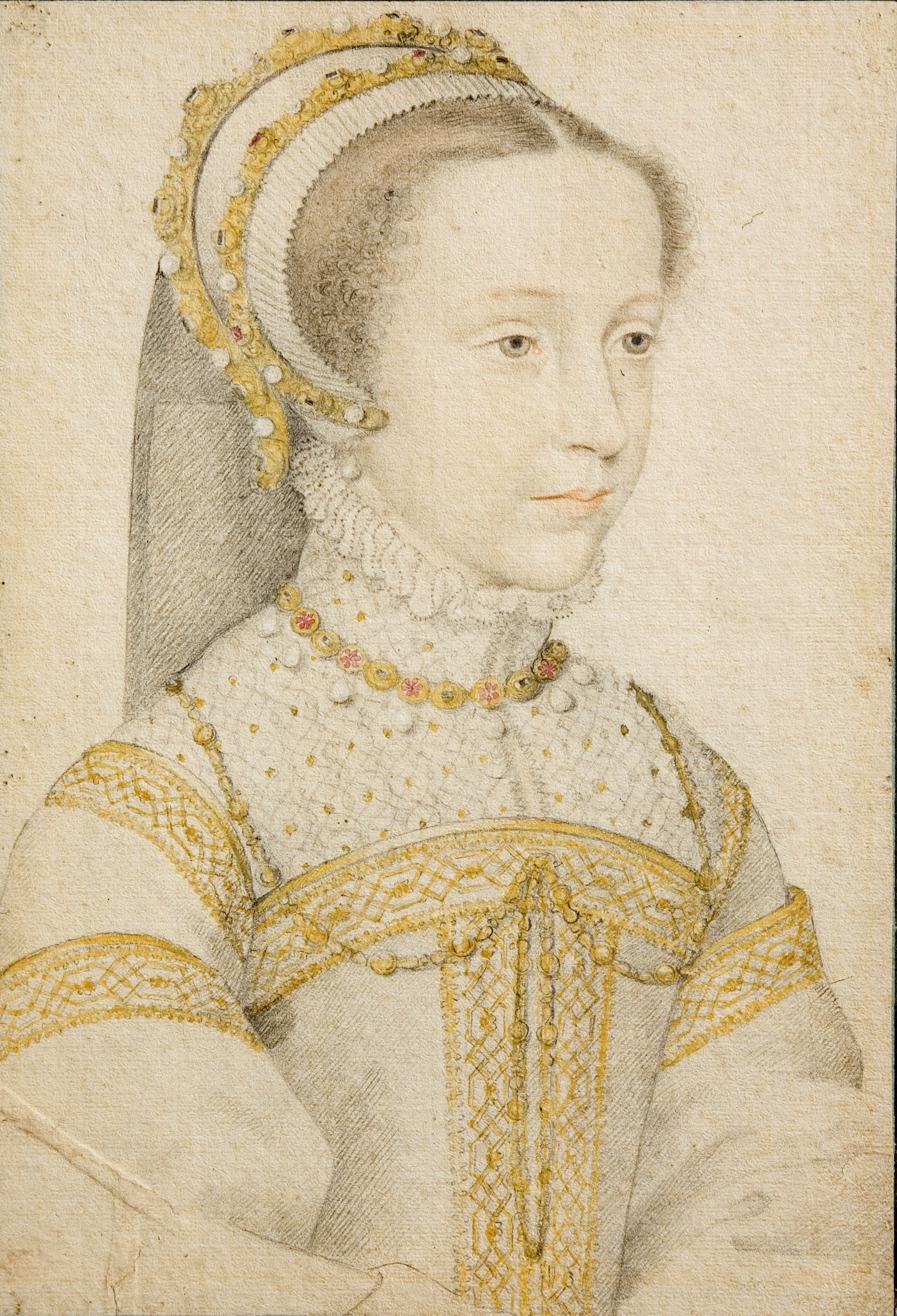
Mary, Queen of Scots, by François Clouet, c. 1555

In April 1554, Châtellerault, as he was now, surrendered the regency to Mary of Guise, and was appointed her lieutenant in Scotland. He gave up the regency on the condition that he would be Queen Mary's heir if she died childless. The Scottish succession, however, had been secretly promised to France.

Châtellerault was still recognised as a significant figure in Scotland. In September 1557, Philip II of Spain, as the husband of Mary I of England, sent Christophe d'Assonleville to broker peace between Scotland and England. Assonleville was instructed to speak to Mary of Guise, the Duke of Châtellerault, and representatives of Edinburgh. He was also instructed to speak with Châtellerault about amicable relations between the Scots and their Flemish trading partners. Assonleville's instructions still include his former title of "governor", though "lieutenant" was now correct.

In the first months of the Scottish Reformation, Châtellerault continued to support Mary of Guise. He faced a Protestant army with the French commander at Cupar Muir in June 1559. He changed his allegiance in August 1559, joining the Protestant Lords of the Congregation to oppose the regency of Mary of Guise, and as a result his French dukedom and its estates were taken back by the new French king, Francis II, the husband of Mary, Queen of Scots. In order to discredit Châtellerault with the English government, a letter was forged by his enemies, in which Châtellerault declared his allegiance to Francis II, but the plot was exposed. On 27 February 1560, he agreed to the Treaty of Berwick with Queen Elizabeth I of England, which placed Scotland under English protection and made provision for an English army to come to the siege of Leith.

After the death of Mary of Guise on 15 June 1560, Châtellerault persuaded the Parliament of Scotland to back a plan to marry his son James Hamilton to Elizabeth I, and then after the death of Francis II on 5 December 1560, he attempted, without success, to arrange for James to marry the young widowed Queen Mary. Instead, Mary married Lord Darnley in 1565.

Queen Mary went on progress to the north in 1562, and the Gordon family were defeated at the battle of Corrichie. Châtellerault spoke with Mary at Dundee in November 1562, hoping to obtain a pardon for his son-in-law Lord Gordon.

In 1566, Châtellerault withdrew to his former estates in France, where he made vain attempts to regain his confiscated duchy, which in 1563 had been granted to Diane de France. In 1569, he returned to Scotland in support of Mary, but was imprisoned by the Earl of Moray, Regent of Mary's infant son, James VI. Parliament declared him a traitor. Moray was assassinated on 23 January 1570 while Châtellerault was still in prison. Nevertheless, Châtellerault was rumoured to have been an accomplice in the regent's murder by James Hamilton of Bothwellhaugh. Châtellerault was released from prison on 20 April 1570. In 1573, he gave up his support for Mary and recognised her infant son as king.

Châtellerault died at Hamilton on 22 January 1575. He was succeeded by his eldest son James as the 3rd Earl of Arran. However, as James was insane, John his younger brother stood in for him.

== Timeline ==
Timeline
As his birth date is uncertain, so are all his ages.
Age	Date	Event			
0	1519, about	Born, probably in Hamilton, South Lanarkshire, Lanarkshire, Scotland.			
2–3	1522, about	Mother died			
9–10	1529	Father died; he succeeded as the 2nd Earl of Arran.			
12–13	1532, c. 23 September	Married Margaret Douglas, daughter of the Earl of Morton			
22–23	1542, 14 Dec	Accession of Mary, Queen of Scots, succeeding James V.			
23–24	1543, Jan	Appointed regent for Mary, Queen of Scots.	23–24	1543, Sep	Turned around: Met Cardinal Beaton at Callendar House and became Catholic
23–24	1543, 20 Dec	England declared war, starting the Rough Wooing			
24–25	1544	Tried to divorce his wife but failed.			
27–28	1547, 10 Sep	Defeated by the English at the Battle of Pinkie			
29–30	1549, 8 Feb	Created Duke of Châtellerault by Henry II of France.			
34–35	1554	Lost the regency to Mary of Guise			
38–39	1558	Mary married Francis, Dauphin of France			
39–40	1559, 10 Jul	Henry II of France died.			
40–41	1560, 27 Feb	Treaty of Berwick negotiated.			
40–41	1560 5 Dec N.S.	Francis II of France died.			
42–43	1562	Son James, his eldest, declared insane			
45–46	1565	Queen Mary married Lord Darnley			
47–48	1567, 24 July	Accession of James VI, succeeding Mary, Queen of Scots.			
48–49	1568, 13 May	Queen Mary lost the Battle of Langside and fled to England.			
50–51	1570, 23 Jan	Regent Regent Moray murdered; Châtellerault might have been involved			
55–56	1575, 22 Jan	Died at Hamilton, South Lanarkshire			

== Genealogical chart ==
Hamilton's relationship to the house of Stuart

James II	Mary of Guelders
James III	Alexander Stewart, Duke of Albany	Mary Stewart	James Hamilton, 1st Lord Hamilton
James IV	John Stewart, Duke of Albany	James Hamilton, 1st Earl of Arran	Elizabeth Hamilton
James Hamilton, Duke of Châtellerault	John Stewart, 3rd Earl of Lennox
Mary of Guise	James V	Matthew Stewart, 4th Earl of Lennox
Mary I	Henry Stuart, Lord Darnley
James VI

== Sources ==
- Bain, Joseph, ed. (1898). Calendar of the State Papers Relating to Scotland and Mary, Queen of Scots 1547–1603. Vol. I. Edinburgh: Her Majesty's General Register House. OCLC 1137227125. – 1547 to 1563
- Bain, Joseph, ed. (1892). The Hamilton Papers. Vol. II. Edinburgh: Her Majesty's General Register House. OCLC 877556059.
- Blakeway, Amy Louise (2015). Regency in Sixteenth-Century Scotland. Woodbridge, Suffolk: The Boydell Press. ISBN 978-1-84383-980-4.
- Burke, Bernard; Burke, Ashworth Peter (1915). A Genealogical and Heraldic History of the Peerage and Baronetage (77th ed.). London: Harrison. OCLC 1155471554.
- Chisholm, Hugh, ed. (1911a). "Arran, Earls of" . Encyclopædia Britannica. Vol. 02 (11th ed.). Cambridge University Press. pp. 642–644.
- Chisholm, Hugh, ed. (1911b). "Hamilton (family)" . Encyclopædia Britannica. Vol. 12 (11th ed.). Cambridge University Press. pp. 878–879.
- Clifford, Arthur (1809). The State Papers and Letters of Ralph Sadler. Vol. I. Edinburgh: Archibald Constable. OCLC 1015501369.
- Debrett, John (1828). Peerage of the United Kingdom of Great Britain and Ireland. Vol. II (17th ed.). London: F. C. and J. Rivington. OCLC 54499602.
- Dickinson, Gladys (1942). Two Missions of Jacques de la Brosse. 3. Vol. 36. Scottish History Society. pp. 7–8.
- Dunlop, Robert (1890). "Hamilton, James, second Earl of Arran and Duke of Châtelherault (d. 1575)". In Lee, Sidney (ed.). Dictionary of National Biography. Vol. XXIV. New York: MacMillan and Co. pp. 167–170. OCLC 8544105.
- Fryde, Edmund Boleslaw; Greenway, D. E.; Porter, S.; Roy, I., eds. (1986). Handbook of British Chronology. Royal Historical Society Guides and Handbooks, No. 2 (3rd ed.). London: Offices of the Royal Historical Society. ISBN 0-86193-106-8.
- Laing, Henry, ed. (1850). Descriptive Catalogue of Impressions from Ancient Schottish Seals. Edinburgh: T. Constable.
- Merriman, Marcus (2004). "Hamilton, James, second earl of Arran (c. 1519–1575)". In Matthew, Colin; Harrison, Brian (eds.). Oxford Dictionary of National Biography. Vol. 24. New York: Oxford University Press. pp. 827–833. ISBN 0-19-861374-1.
- Paul, James Balfour (1907). Scots Peerage. Vol. IV. Edinburgh: David Douglas. OCLC 505064285.
- Warnicke, Retha M. (2006). Mary Queen of Scots. New York: Routledge. ISBN 978-0-415-29182-8.

== Attribution ==
Peerage of Scotland
Preceded by James Hamilton	Earl of Arran; 1529–1548	Succeeded by James Hamilton
French nobility
Vacant Title last held by Charles de Valois	Duke of Châtellerault; 1548–1559	Vacant Title next held by Diane de France
