= Earnock =

Coordinates: 55.7500°N 4.0333°W

- Location within South Lanarkshire
- Language: English
- Council area: South Lanarkshire
- Lieutenancy area: Lanarkshire
- Country: Scotland
- Sovereign state: United Kingdom
- Police: Scotland
- Fire: Scottish
- Ambulance: Scottish

Earnock was an ancient estate in an area south of Hamilton in Lanarkshire, Scotland. It extended from the western side of Strathaven Road to the western extremity of the Parish of Hamilton.

== Etymology ==
Sir John Sinclair's Statistical Account of Scotland attributes Earnock to the Celtic Earnogg, “the old son’s possessions” (Sinclair 1791) while Stothers suggests alternatively ‘Ireland’ (Stothers nd). James Johnston's Place-names of Scotland postulates a Gaelic etymology, from earr an achaidh "end/boundary of the field". (Johnston 1892)

== History ==
Earnock was originally part of the grant of Cadzow to Walter fitz Gilbert (progenitor of the Hamiltons of Cadzow) in 1314. It was received by the progenitor of the Roberton family, Robert de Robertoun, by feudal charter from either Malcolm IV or William I between 1160 and 1200 (Beverage nd)

The Robertouns were feudal Lairds of Earnock from prior to 1226 – 1296 and 1390 - c 1700. ( The family were dispossessed for signing the Ragman Roll (Rampant Scotland). Simon Robertoun regained Earnock through marriage to a daughter of David fitz Walter of Cadzow (Beverage nd) (Nesbitt A nd) ). It was sold by James Roberton, 12th Laird of Earnock, to a Mr Semple at the turn of the 19th century. He in turn sold the property to A. Millar, Esq., in 1810.

Earnockmuir, part of the original estate was inherited by Sir William Erskine Cochrane,(Hamilton Advertiser 1874) (brother of Lord Dundonald) great-grandson of the last Laird of Earnock. He sold it along with part of Annesfield Farm to a Mr Dixon sometime after his retirement in 1819 (Philippart 1820)

Upon Millar's death his married sister Mrs Williams inherited it, and sold it to Sir John Watson, baronet. None of the Robertons’ house remains although it is said " the great hall was beautifully decorated with armorial bearings of the Robertons, and that the fireplace was remarkable for its carving." (Hamilton Advertiser 1943) Watson and his descendants built a mansion upon the site. (Hamilton Advertiser 1943)

Electric light was introduced to the house in 1881 although the town of Hamilton did not receive electricity until 1903. The house was sold in 1925 and demolished in 1926. (Stothers nd)

== Overseas ==
When John Roberton of Glasgow settled in New Zealand in the 19th century he named his Takapuna property "Earnock", after the family estate in Scotland.(Rae 1992) The house, a white weather-board structure, still stands on Hustmere Road, Takapuna. It is used as a hair dressing salon.
