= Friar Mark Hamilton =

Scottish Dominican friar

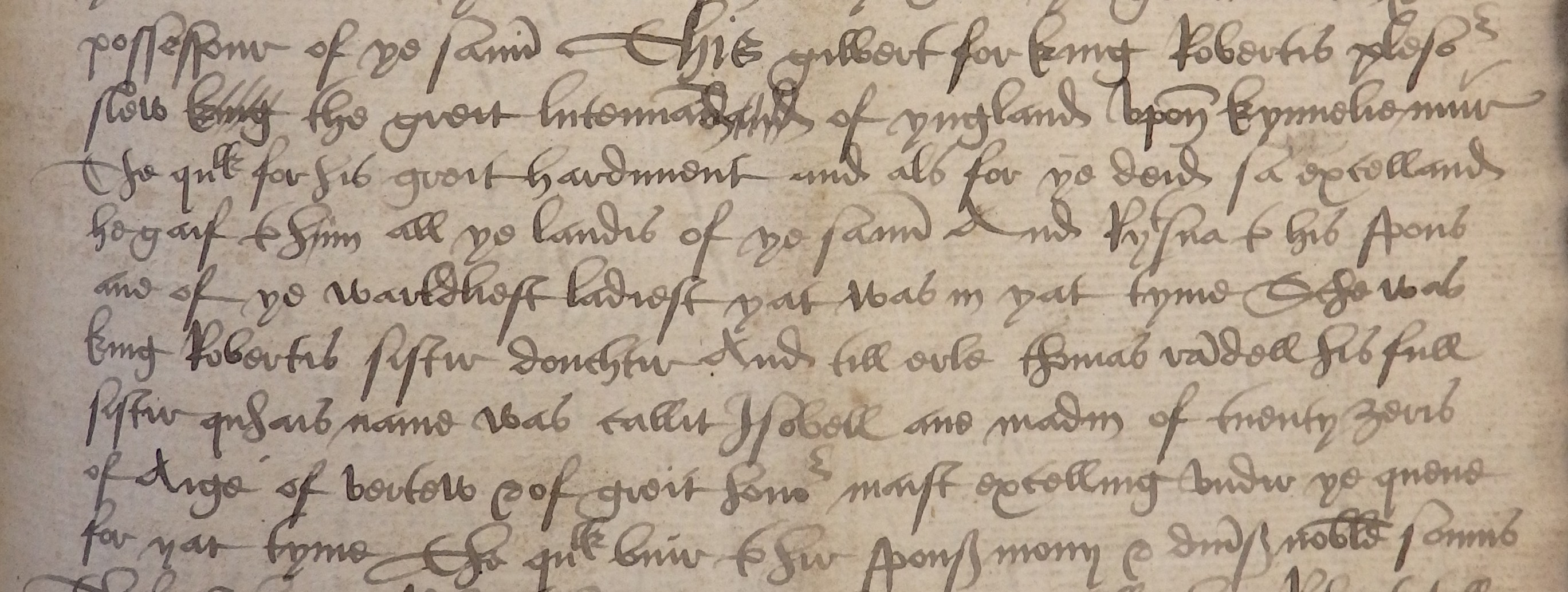
Detail from the National Library of Scotland manuscript of Friar Mark's History

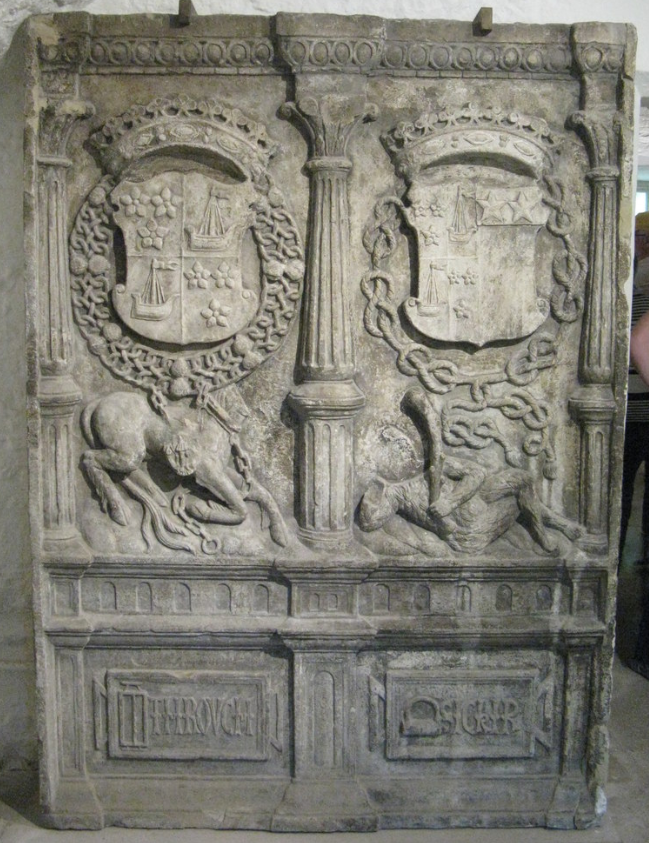
Armorial stone of Regent Arran and his wife Margaret Douglas at Kinneil House

Friar Mark's History seeks to explain the Clan Hamilton heraldry

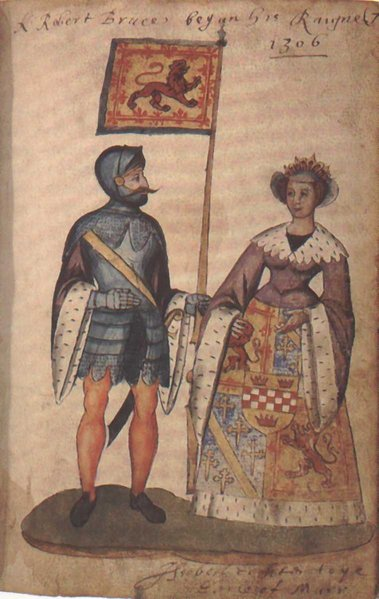
King Robert and Isabella of Mar, from the Seton Armorial

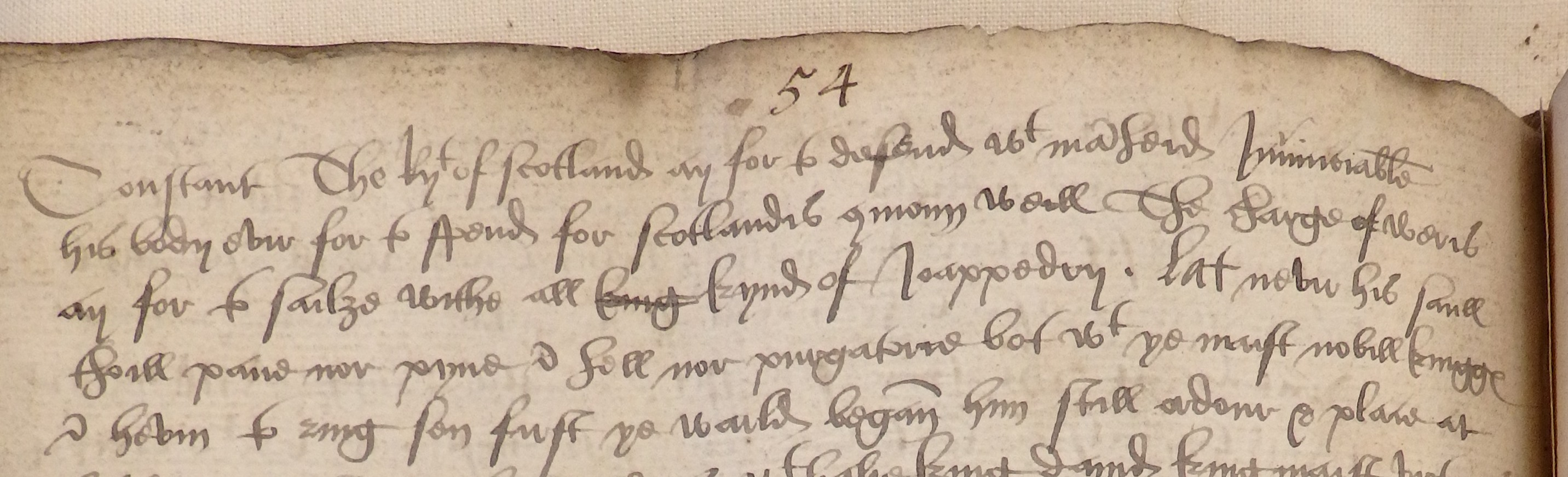
Part of Gilbert's Hamilton's oration, National Library of Scotland

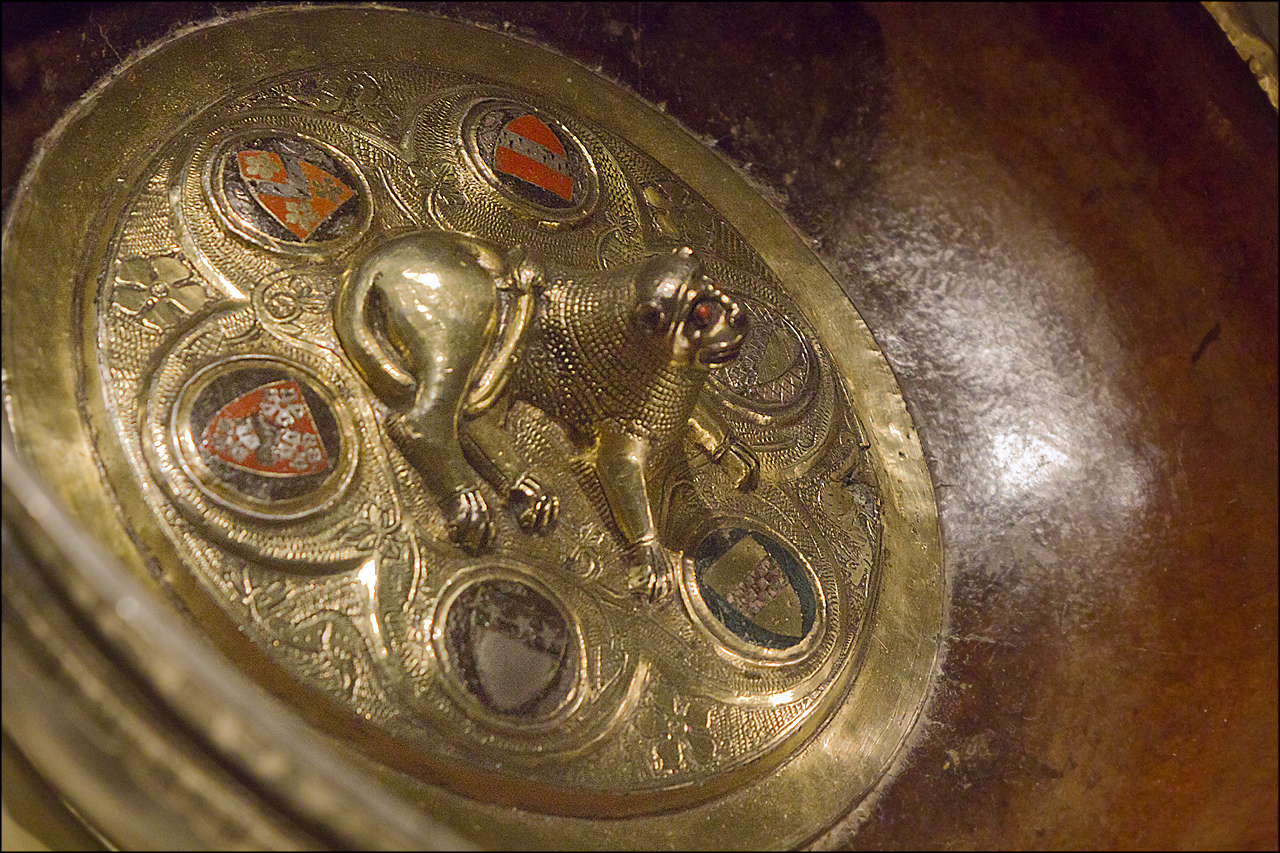
The boss or print of the Bute Mazer

Friar Mark Hamilton (floruit c. 1553) was a Scottish Dominican and author of a History of the Hamiltons. His kinsman Regent Arran gave Friar Mark Hamilton £4 Scots for a friar's habit on 20 September 1553. Apart from his History and the record of the gift of a habit, few other details of Friar Mark's life are known.

== Friar Mark's History of the Hamiltons ==
Friar Mark is known for his history of the origins of the Hamilton family, identified as an important document for the culture of the Scottish court in the time of Arran's Regency, (1543-1554). The short narrative mixes historical sources and family legends. It mentions the Hamiltons' English ancestry, which Regent Arran frequently asserted to the English ambassador Ralph Sadler. The manuscript is held by the National Library of Scotland.

=== The fight on Kinniel Muir ===
The text includes an old family tradition that has been described as a "fabulous story". The History states that Robert the Bruce gave the lands of Kinneil to Gilbert Hamilton, "for his trew service and greit manheid," and especially for having slain "for King Robertis pleasour the great lieutennand of Yngland upon Kynnale Muir. " Gilbert Hamilton had been with Robert Bruce at the battle of Bannockburn, and was one of the seven knights of the royal bodyguard. A large stone was said to mark the place where fight took place.

For Sir Gilbert's exploit on Kinneil Muir vanquishing "Odomar Vallance" the Welsh-born Lieutenant of Edward II of England, Friar Mark tells us, "King Robert gaif till him his armis till weir in Scotland thre sink fuilzies in ane bludy field," or modernised: King Robert gave to him forever to wear in heraldry in Scotland three cinquefoils in a blood red field.

=== Gilbert and Walter fitz Gilbert in the History ===
"Gilbert Hamilton" represents the older brother of a known historical figure, Walter fitz Gilbert of Cadzow. "Cadzow" is an old name for Hamilton, South Lanarkshire. Sir Walter's arms appear on the Bute Mazer, a famous cup held by the National Museums of Scotland.

Friar Mark says the younger brother Walter fitz Gilbert was red haired and ruddy in complexion, traits inherited from his Scottish mother. He was schooled by the monks at Dunfermline Abbey. Their father was Philip, Earl of Southampton, in England. The actual relationships of these early members of the Hamilton family are unclear.

=== Isabella of Mar ===
Friar Mark wrote that Isabella of Mar was; "ane of the warldliest ladiest that was in that tyme scho was King Robertis sister douchtir and till erle Thomas Randell his full sister quhais name was callit Isobell ane madin of twenty yeris of aige of vertew & of greit honour maist excelling undir the quene for that tyme". In modern terms, Isabella was "one of the most chivalric women of that age, the niece of King Robert and sister of Thomas Randolph, she was a maiden aged 20 of virtue and great honour exceeded only by the Queen of Scots."

=== Gilbert Hamilton's oration ===
The final section of the manuscript text is the "Oratio Gilberti Hammiltoune in funera Roberti Brus Regis" - supposed to be a translation of a Latin prayer Gilbert Hamilton said at the funeral of Robert the Bruce at Dunfermline Abbey in 1329, which includes this phrase;

quhill that his life in erd may lest with hart & mynd constant, The rycht of Scotland ay for to defend with manheid invinciable, his body evir for to spend for Scotlandis common weill, The charge of weris, ay for to failye withe all kind of jeappedry; Lat nevir his saull thoall pane nor pyne in hell nor purgatorie bot with the most nobill kings in hevin to ring.

(modernised)
While that his [King Robert's] life on Earth may last with heart & mind constant, The right of Scotland always to defend with invincible courage, his body ever to reserve for Scotland's commonwealth, The duty of war, ever to engage in all kinds of warlike hazardry. Let never his soul suffer pain or pine away in Hell or purgatory, but with the most noble kings in Heaven to reign.

By these lines, Friar Mark may have meant that the Hamiltons were bound by memory of King Robert to fight and sue for peace on behalf of the Scottish people, the common weil or "common wealth". It is unlikely that this prayer was in reality said at the king's funeral.
