= James Hamilton of Cadzow =

Scottish nobleman and royal hostage

Sir James Hamilton of Cadzow, 5th Laird of Cadzow (before 1397 – c. 1440) was a Scottish nobleman and royal hostage.

== Biography ==
The legal son of Sir John Hamilton of Cadzow and his wife, Jacoba Douglas, James Hamilton is first attested to in 1397. In a writ of that year, his father Sir John Hamilton granted him the lands and privileges of Kinneil, in return for the superiority of all property that had been promised to him through his marriage after his attainment of majority. According to DNA evidence, he was likely not the biological child of Sir John Hamilton. It is unknown whether John Hamilton was aware of this, as another son of his, Walter Hamilton, shared Y-Chromosomal DNA, and James Hamilton did not. John had been fighting in military campaigns against both the English and Scottish outlaws (Alexander Stewart, Earl of Buchan) at a similar time to when James may have been conceived. This would mean that the current Duke of Hamilton is not lineally descended from Clan Hamilton, (although the current Duke would not be a patrilineal descendant of the original progenitor either way, due to the patrilineal branch of the male line extinguishing with Anne Hamilton, 3rd Duchess of Hamilton).

Hamilton next comes to notice in a Safe-conduct issued by Henry V of England to travel to Calthorpe Castle in Lincolnshire.

In 1424, Hamilton was one of the Scottish Lords allowed passage to Durham to visit the captive James I of Scotland. In the same year, he was one of many Scots hostages given to the English as security for the payment of the ransom of the newly freed King of Scots. His estate was valued at 500 merks.

Hamilton was confined first at Fotheringay Castle, then at Dover Castle. He appears to have been released by 1426. He was invested as a knight before 1430.

Hamilton died not later than 1441, when his son is described as Lord of Cadzow.

== Marriage and children ==
James Hamilton married Janet Livingston before 1422, when he received a charter of the lands of Schawis from his father-in-law, Sir Alexander Livingston of Callendar. By Janet Livingston, Hamilton had six children:

- James Hamilton, 6th Laird of Cadzow - later made a Lord of Parliament as 1st Lord Hamilton
- Alexander Hamilton - ancestor of the Hamiltons of Silvertonhill
- John Hamilton
- Gavin Hamilton - ancestor of the Hamiltons of Dalzell
- Agnes Hamilton - married Sir James Hamilton of Preston
- Elizabeth Hamilton - married Chalmers of Gadgirth
- Mary Hamilton - married in France

Preceded by John Hamilton	Baron of Cadzow c. 1402–c. 1440	Succeeded by James Hamilton
