= David Hamilton of Cadzow =

Scottish nobleman

Sir David Hamilton of Cadzow, 3rd Laird of Cadzow (ca. 1333 – ca. 1392) was a Scottish nobleman.

== Biography ==
The son of Sir David fitz Walter fitz Gilbert de Hameldone of Cadzow, he was born at Cadzow Castle, South Lanarkshire.

David Hamilton was the first of the family recorded as formally using the surname Hamilton, appearing in a writ of 1375 as "David de Hamylton, son and heir of David fitz Walter". in 1378, he is styled David de Hamilton, and in 1381 David Hamilton, Lord of Cadzow. It appears that he was the first to use the Baronial designation of Lord.

== Marriage and issue ==
David Hamilton married Jonetta Keith daughter of Sir William Keith of Galston, a crusading colleague of the Good Sir James Douglas. She survived David Hamilton, and went on to marry Sir Alexander Stewart of Darnley. By Jonetta Keith, David Hamilton had six children:

- John Hamilton of Cadzow
- Sir William Hamilton – ancestor of the Hamiltons of Bathgate
- Andrew Hamilton – ancestor of the Hamiltons of Udstoun
- John Hamilton of Bardowie
- Elizabeth Hamilton – married Sir Alexander Fraser of Cowie
- George Hamilton of Borland

Preceded by David fitz Walter	Baron of Cadzow c. 1378 – c. 1392	Succeeded by John Hamilton
