= David fitz Walter of Cadzow =

Scottish nobleman

Sir David fitz Walter of Cadzow or David fitz Walter fitz Gilbert de Hameldone, 2nd Laird of Cadzow (bef. 1346 – bef. 1378) was a Scottish nobleman.

== Biography ==
The son of Sir Walter fitz Gilbert of Cadzow de Hameldone, he succeeded his father as Baron of Cadzow before 1346, when he was captured at the Battle of Neville's Cross. He was considered an important enough captive to be held by William Zouche, Archbishop of York, under special terms that he not be released, except under command of Edward III of England. He is thought to have been knighted prior to the battle.

The next reference to David fitz Walter is in 1361 when he endowed Glasgow Cathedral with a Chaplainry.

In 1368, he received confirmation from the King, David II, of his patrimonial Lands of Cadzow and elsewhere, with the addition of the lands and tenantry of Eddlewood.

David fitz Walter took part in the sittings of the Parliament of Scotland in 1371 and 1373, the latter to confirm John Stewart, Earl of Carrick and his successors as heirs to the throne of Scotland. The charter, at New Register House in Edinburgh, still has his seal appended, with the three cinquefoils for Hamilton, and the inscription,: Sigill David filii Walter.

== Marriage and issue ==
The name of David fitz Walter's spouse is not clear, many sources suggest that she was Margaret Leslie, daughter of Walter Leslie and Euphemia of Ross. By her he had at least five children:

- David Hamilton of Cadzow
- John Hamilton of Fingaltoun
- Walter Hamilton- ancestor of the Hamiltons of Cambuskeith and Sanquhar
- Alan Hamilton of Larbert
- unknown daughter- married Simon Roberton of Earnock

Preceded by Walter fitz Gilbert	Baron of Cadzow c. 1346–c. 1378	Succeeded by David Hamilton
