= Roberton, South Lanarkshire =

Coordinates: 55.5492°N 3.65°W

Roberton: Scottish Gaelic: Baile Raibeirt; Scots: Robertin
- Location within South Lanarkshire
- Population: 135
- Language: English
- Council area: South Lanarkshire
- Lieutenancy area: Lanarkshire
- Country: Scotland
- Sovereign state: United Kingdom
- Post town: BIGGAR
- Postcode district: ML12
- Police: Scotland
- Fire: Scottish
- Ambulance: Scottish

Roberton is a village in South Lanarkshire, Scotland.

== Origins ==
The origins of the town of Roberton are intertwined with those of the Robertons of that Ilk, Earnock, Bedlay, and Lauchope.

Black 1965 describes the etymology as literally 'the Town of Robert'. This Robert was brother of Lambin Asa, who was the progenitor of the Earls of Loddon and Lamington. Ritchie 1954, Reid 1928 and Grant 2007 assert the origins of Robert as a Flemish feudal vassal of Baldwin of Biggar.

It is first mentioned in a charter by Wice of Wiston tything it to Malcolm IV (Reid 1928). Grant dates ‘Robert, brother of Lambin’ as the first lord c.1157.

=== Brother of Lambin Asa ===
The Chartulary of Kelso gives Robert as the brother of Lambyn Asa who was the Laird of Lesmahagow. Lambyn appears to have held lands in and around Lesmahagow (the regal barony), including what became the barony of Lamington, alongside William Comyn at or around the time the grant of Lesmahagow was made to the Abbey of Kelso by David I. As a consequence Lambyn became the Laird of Lesmahagow and the minor baronies were then divided up between his family and associates with terms based on the original grant of the lands of Draffan to Lambyn and then to his son James. It seems Lambyn had previously been in Yorkshire, as were Theobald and Baldwin, where his family had become Lords of Multon under the Earl of Richmond. Theobald took the grant of Douglas (from whom descends the famous Douglas family), Baldwin became Sheriff of Biggar and subsequently married the widow of Reginald, illegitimate son of Alan, Earl of Richmond, who had taken land which subsequently became the barony of CrawfordJohn in the possession of John son of Reginald and stepson of Baldwin.

The precise family relationship of Theobald and Baldwin to Lambyn Asa is not clear, especially as Robert is specifically stated to be his brother and Eustace of Ardoch to be a member of his family. For reference, consult the Cartulary of Kelso from the Bannatyne Club (Liber S Marie de Calchou), Annals of Lesmahagow (J B Greenshields) and Burkes Commoners.

== The Barony ==
It became the seat of the Robertons of that ilk until their dispossession by Robert I for Stephen de Robertoun's signing of the 1296 Ragman Roll. It was subsequently bestowed upon Sir James Douglas, ancestor of the Earls of Morton (Beverage n.d.).

== The Parish ==
Roberton was a parish town chartered by Kelso Abbey (Reid 1928),(Beverage).

Historically it was an Established Church of Scotland. It merged with Wiston in 1772, and became a United Presbyterian Church in 1847. In 1843 a Free Church was established that dwindled, ultimately belonging to the Presbytery of Jedburgh by 1880 (Familysearch)

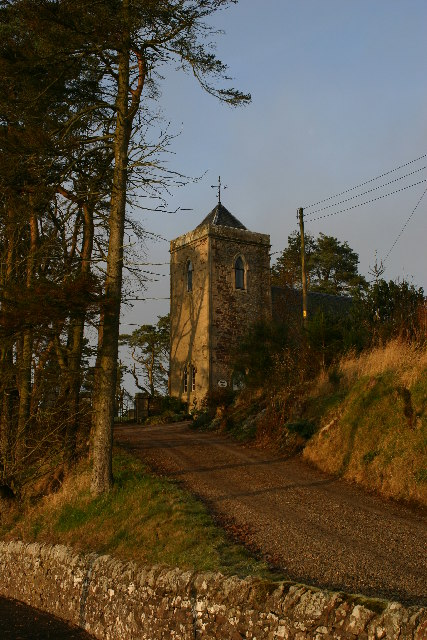

In the mid 1990s the church was purchased by musician John Martyn, who converted it into a recording studio, and recorded his 1998 album "The Church With One Bell" there. Before buying the church, Martyn was living in an adjoining cottage.

== Geography ==
Roberton is most notable for being one of the earliest documented Flemish settlements in Lanarkshire, and at 12 square miles (31 km^{2}) in size it was one of the largest in the Flemish enclave around Biggar (Grant). Running beside the river Clyde for 6 miles (10 km), the agriculture included oats and barley (Sinclair 1791)
