= Bute mazer =

Medieval communal feasting cup

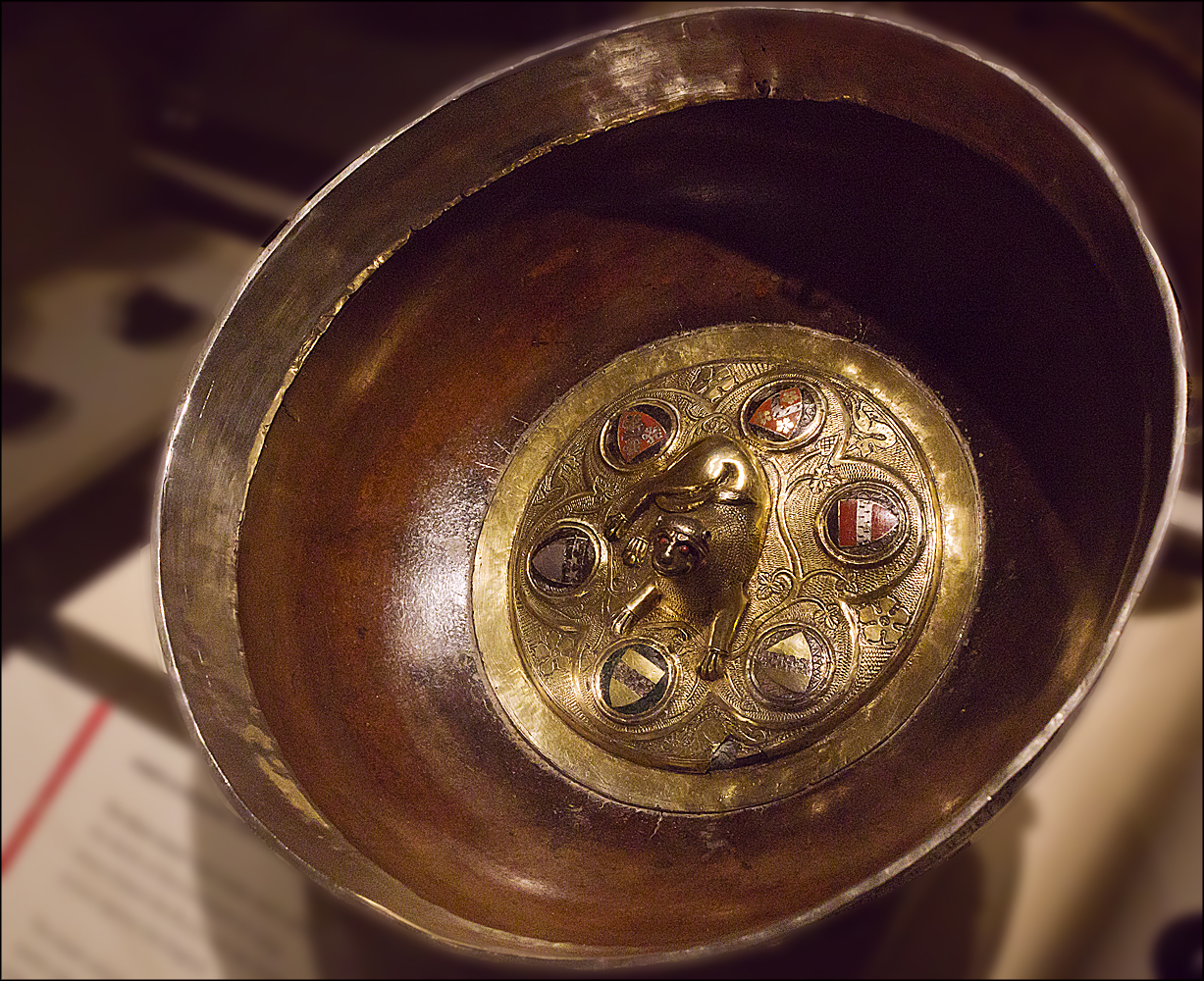
The Bute Mazer

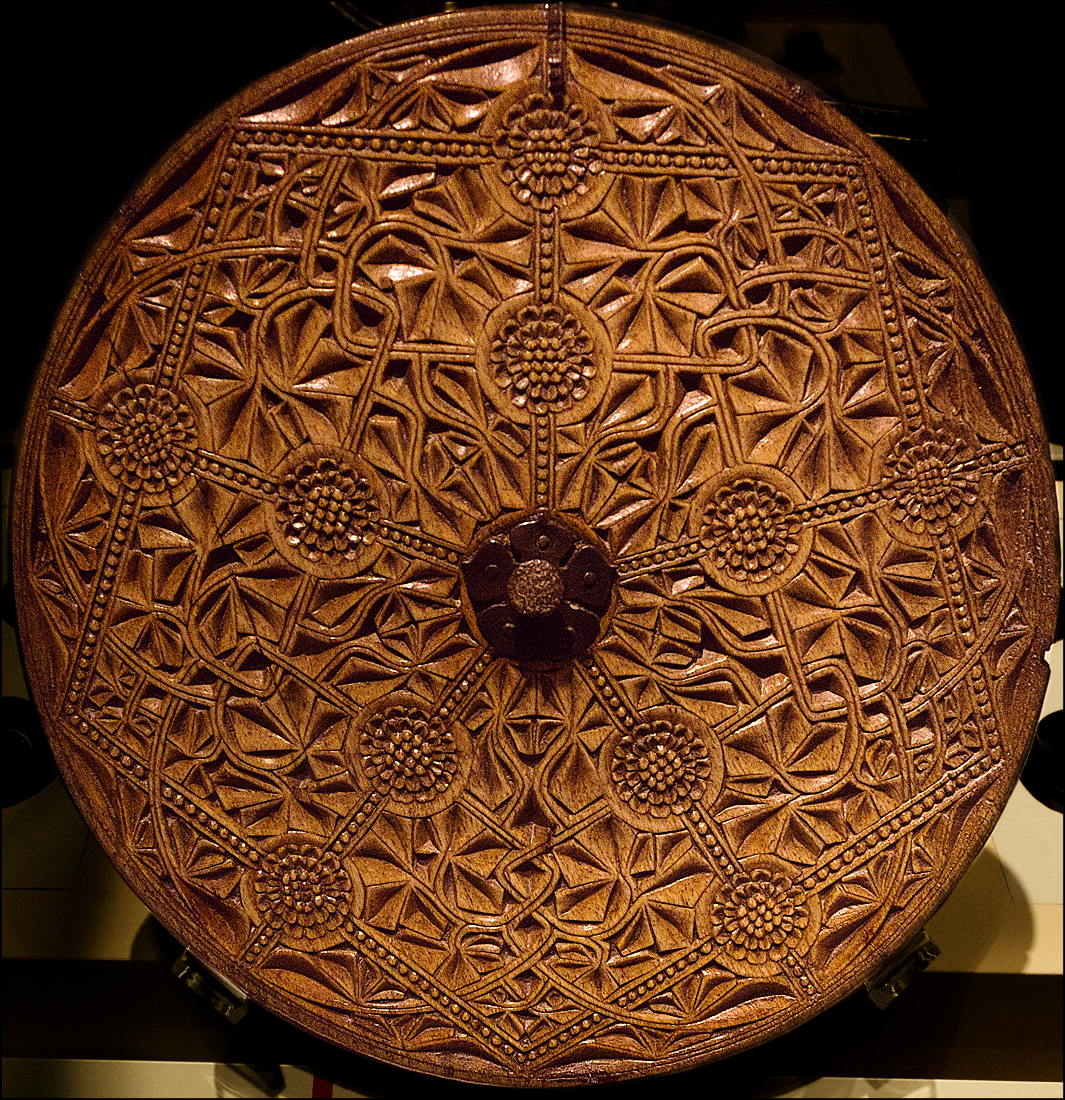
The Bute Mazer's later whale bone cover

The Bute Mazer, also known as the Bannatyne Mazer, is a medieval communal feasting cup of a type known as a mazer. The wood bowl and the elaborate silver-gilt "boss" in the centre are dated "fairly firmly" to between 1314 and 1327 from the heraldry, with the rim and cover about 1500. It is the oldest Scottish mazer still surviving, and one of the oldest and most elaborate British ones. The cup has long been associated with the Isle of Bute, on the west coast of Scotland. Its alternative name derives from Ninian Bannatyne, Laird of Kames, who owned the cup in the 16th century and had his name engraved on the rim. The mazer is now on loan from the Bannatyne family to the National Museum of Scotland in Edinburgh.

== History ==
The Bute Mazer was probably commissioned by the FitzGilbert or Gilbertson family, whose arms appear twice, with further cinquefoils used beside the shields. They were a prominent family, but "did not quite rank with the great magnates" whose arms are also represented. It may have been used by King Robert the Bruce (reigned 1306–1329) at Rothesay Castle on Bute. Rothesay at this time was the seat of Walter Stewart, 6th High Steward of Scotland (1293–1326). The six coats of arms on the mazer represent six leading Scottish noble families, including that of Walter Stewart. Three of the coats of arms on the cup represent signatories of the Declaration of Arbroath, a statement of Scottish independence written in 1320.

== Description ==
The bowl of the cup is made of turned maplewood, while the foot is silver. Silver and silver-gilt hinged straps and a rim were added in the 16th century, when the cup was owned by the Bannatynes. This work may have been carried out by Peter Lymeburner, a goldsmith in Glasgow. In the bottom of the bowl is a metal boss, decorated with a recumbent and grinning couchant lion in high relief, who looks up at the viewer, and is surrounded by six coats of arms.

The lion is cast and creates hollows visible from underneath. It has red enamel eyes and was secured to the main plate of the boss by pins and solder. The rest of the plate is punched and engraved with wyverns and cinquefoils, and a strawberry plant trailing among the shields. On the outside, there are six decorated straps running between the rim and the foot, which date from the refurbishment in about 1500.

Assuming the date around 1320 suggested by the heraldry, the mazer is "an ambitious concept constructed by a conservative and ultra cautious craftsman", almost certainly in Scotland. The style is somewhat dated by the standards of Paris or London, and the style of the lion seems to be based on Limoges enamel examples of over a century earlier. The construction is very robust, and the execution of high quality. The filling between the shields and their circular frames is in a very early Scottish attempt at translucent basse taille enamel, only invented on the continent some forty years before, which is not entirely successful in terms of translucency.

The silver rim and the whale bone cover date from about 1500, and are less fine in quality; they are likely to have been replacements.

=== Heraldry ===
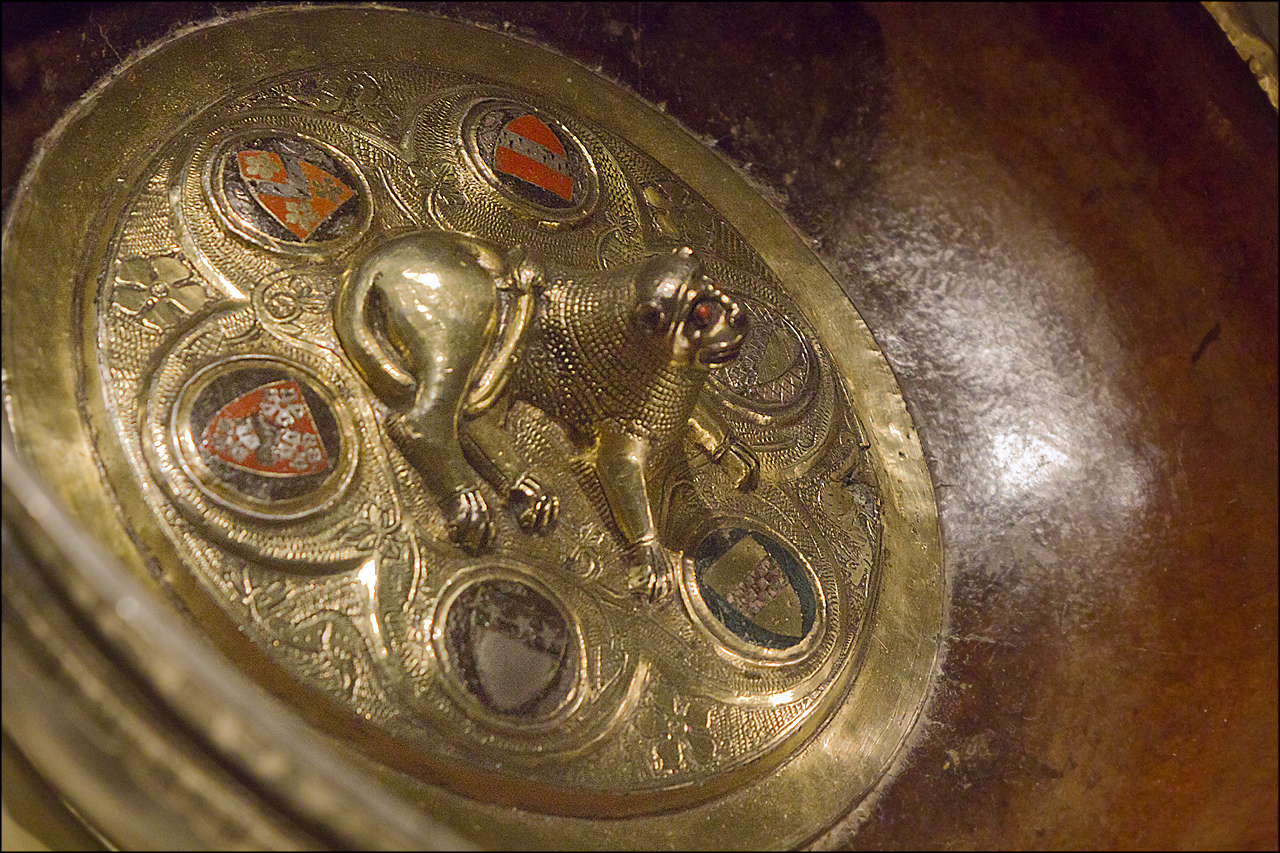
Detail of the boss

The lion is thought by some to represent Robert the Bruce, but considered too informal to do so by others, The six enamelled shields with coats of arms represent the families of six of Bruce's supporters (in clockwise order starting between the front paws of the lion):

- House of Stewart, as represented by Walter, the High Steward
- Douglas, as represented by Bruce's companion, Sir James Douglas (1286–1330)
- Walter FitzGilbert (died c.1346), ancestor of the Dukes of Hamilton
- John FitzGilbert, Baillie of Bute and possibly brother of Walter
- Crawford of Loudoun
- Menteith, a branch of the Stewart family

It has been observed that Douglas is at the lion's right hand, to represent Sir James Douglas' position as Bruce's principal commander, while Stewart is between the lion's paws, since Walter Stewart was married to the King's daughter Marjorie. Their son inherited the throne as King Robert II in 1371, the first monarch of the House of Stewart.
