= Cadzow Castle =

Castle ruins in South Lanarkshire, Scotland

Coordinates: 55°45′38″N 4°01′03″W

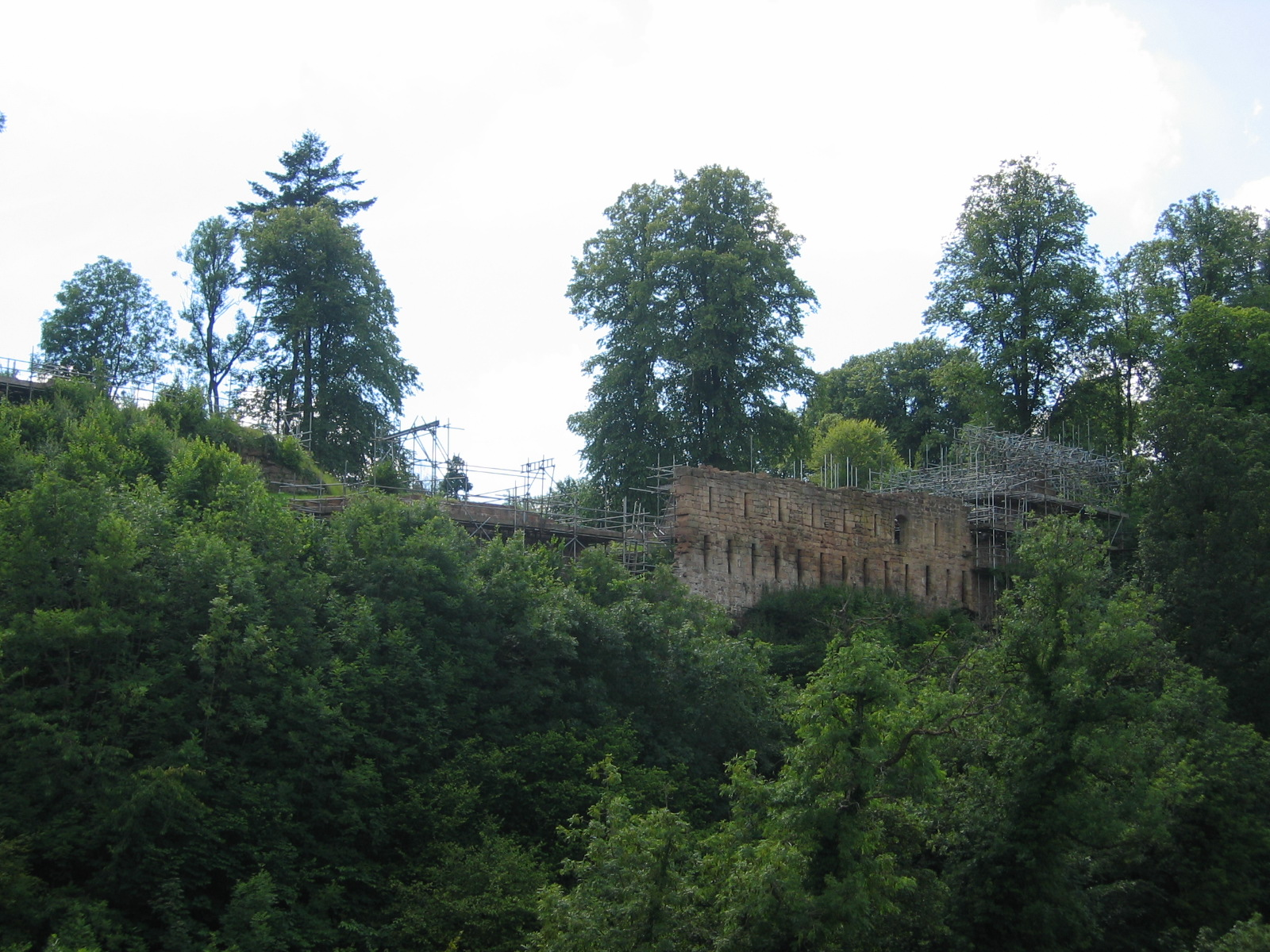
Cadzow Castle, seen across the Avon Gorge from the Duke's Bridge

Cadzow Castle (IPA: /'kæd.juː/), now in ruins, was constructed between 1500 and 1550 at a site one mile south-east of the centre of Hamilton, South Lanarkshire, Scotland. The earlier medieval settlement of Hamilton was formerly known as Cadzow or Cadyou (Middle Scots: Cadȝow), until it was renamed in 1455 in honour of James Hamilton, 1st Lord Hamilton. The castle sits above a gorge overlooking the Avon Water in what is now Chatelherault Country Park, but was previously the hunting and pleasure grounds of the duke of Hamilton's estate of Hamilton Palace - this area being known as Hamilton High Parks. The ruin is a Scheduled Ancient Monument.

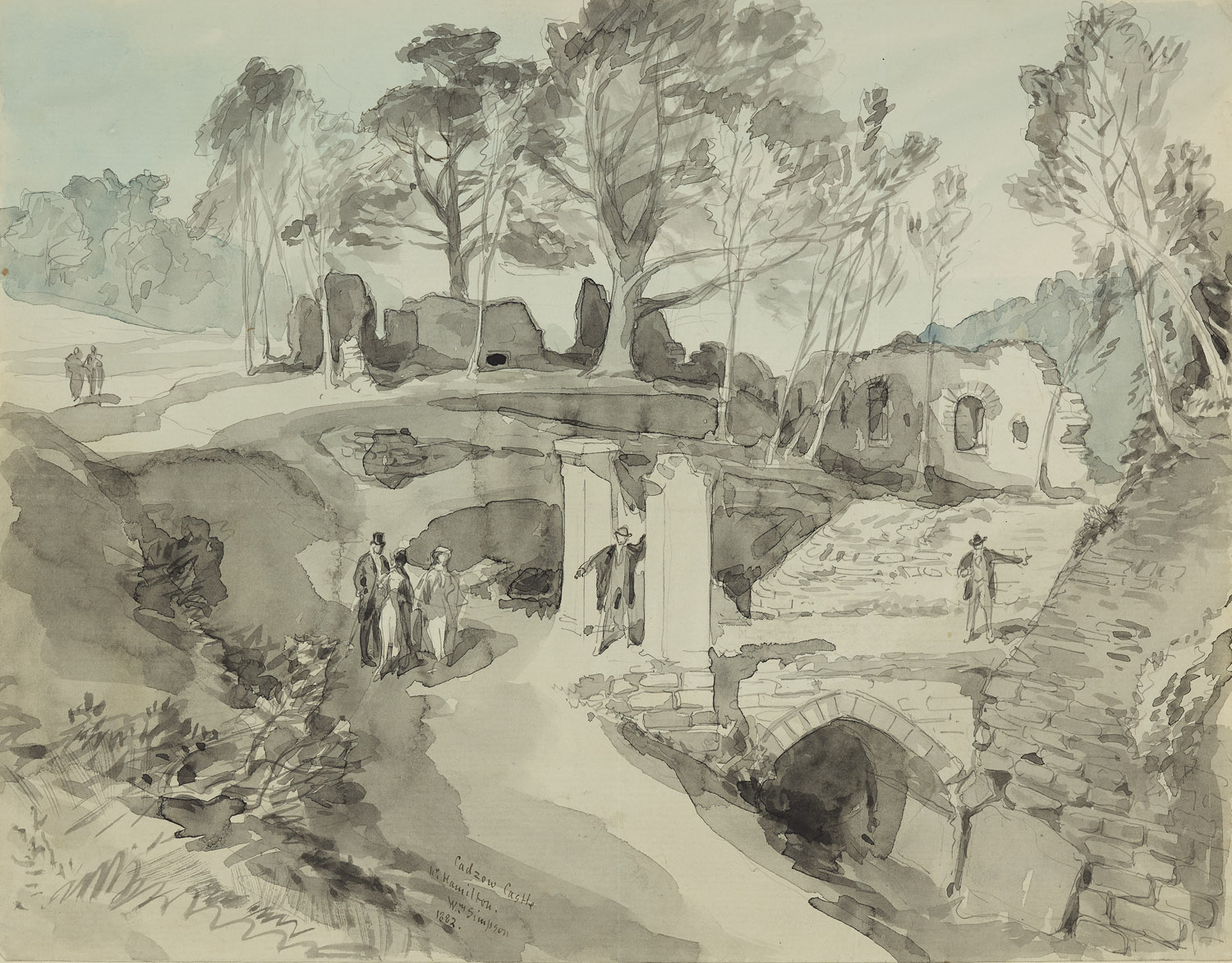
Cadzow Castle, sketched by William Simpson in 1882

== History ==
=== The early castle ===
The ancient kings of Strathclyde are believed to have had a hunting lodge at Cadzow, prior to that kingdom's assimilation into Scotland in the 12th century. The original Cadzow Castle is believed to have been built in the 12th century on an earlier high-status site, as an occasional royal residence for King David I (1124–1153). Royal charters of David's reign were issued from here as early as 1139. His successors Alexander II, Alexander III and others down to Robert the Bruce also used the castle, it is believed primarily as a hunting lodge due to the close proximity of the forested parkland, itself part of the once more extensive royal forest of the Clyde Valley. Archaeologists favour the site of Hamilton Motte adjacent to the original settlement and religious foundation, and known latterly as Hamilton Motte. It is possible that the earlier Cadzow Castle was on an alternative site at NS729548, now known as Castlehill, although the area is now a housing estate, and the site is some distance from the settlement of Cadzow, and of dubious topographical prospects for such a fortification.

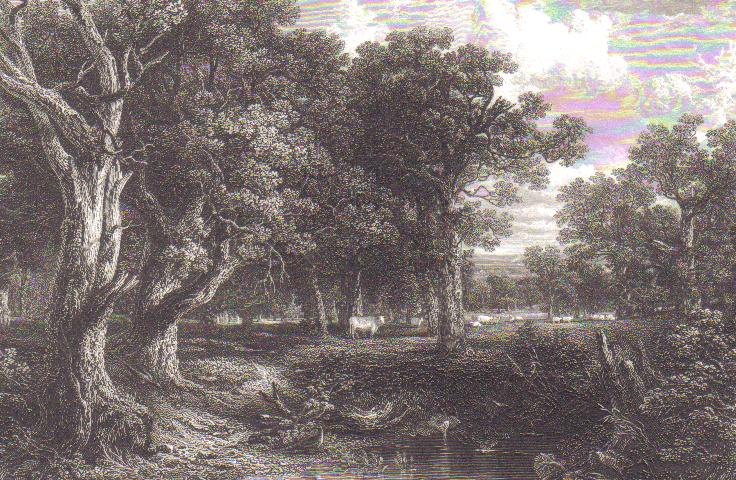
The ancient Cadzow oak woodland pasture, and Cadzow White Park cattle in the 19th century.

The estate of Cadzow was divided in 1222, with Cadzow Castle passing to the Comyns. Following the forfeiture of their lands for supporting John Balliol, the estate was granted by Robert the Bruce to Walter FitzGilbert de Hambeldon in the early 14th century. FitzGilbert was ennobled as the first Baron of Cadzow, and is the ancestor of the dukes of Hamilton. He constructed another fortification, which may represent the motte near the town (NS729548), which remains, adjacent to the M74 motorway.

=== The 16th-century castle ===
The present castle was built around 1530 by Sir James Hamilton of Finnart, who also constructed nearby Craignethan Castle. James Hamilton, 3rd Earl of Arran was confined here in April 1566 after four years in Edinburgh Castle, for an alleged plot against Mary, Queen of Scots.

Following her escape from Lochleven Castle in 1568, Mary, Queen of Scots, stayed here. As a result it was destroyed by forces of the Earl of Mar, regent for James VI, in the late 16th century, as retaliation against the Hamiltons for their support of Mary. It was partially rebuilt in the 18th century, to serve as a folly within the duke's park.

== The castle today ==
The site is now owned and managed by Historic Environment Scotland. There is no public access to the ruins, as the structure is unstable, and largely supported by scaffolding. Footpaths within the country park allow visitors to view the ruin. The Duke's Bridge, built high across the Avon Gorge, offers the most dramatic view of the ruins above the wooded gorge. A series of excavations, sponsored by Historic Scotland, took place at the castle between 2000 and 2003 and demonstrated that no evidence was found to support an early medieval fortification at the site, nor any large settlement to compete with the traditional medieval settlement of Cadzow now adjacent to the M74 motorway, and in later centuries called the Netherton to distinguish it from the 'Hitoun' of Cadzow.
