= John Hamilton of Cadzow =

Scottish nobleman and soldier

Sir John Hamilton
- Laird of Cadzow
- Coat of arms
- Tenure: c. 1392–c. 1402
- Predecessor: Sir David Hamilton, 3rd Laird of Cadzow
- Successor: Sir James Hamilton, 5th Laird of Cadzow
- Spouse: Jacoba Douglas (before 1388)
- Issue: Sir James Hamilton, 5th Laird of Cadzow; David Hamilton; Walter Hamilton; Catherine Hamilton
- Father: Sir David Hamilton, 3rd Laird of Cadzow
- Mother: Jonetta Keith

Sir John Hamilton of Cadzow, 4th Laird of Cadzow (born before 1370 – died c. 1402) was a Scottish nobleman and soldier.

== Biography ==
He succeeded his father, Sir David Hamilton of Cadzow, no later than 1392, when he appears on a charter of Andrew Murray of Touchadam as Dominus de Cadzow.

He was imprisoned, along with his brothers William and Andrew, in Norwich in 1396. Richard II of England ordered their release from the Mayor and bailies of that city on 29 June. It appears that their imprisonment was due to violations of the truce between the Kingdoms of England and Scotland. A John Hamilton, either his brother John Hamilton of Bardowie, or uncle John Hamilton of Fingalton, was released from the Tower of London on the same date. Hamilton and his uncle seem to have found themselves guests of the English again, when at a meeting of Border commissioners at Hawdenstank on 28 October 1398, the first point of business was the release of Hamilton of Cadzow, and Hamilton of Fingalton and others in their entourage. The Hamiltons had been caught at sea by English privateers, again in violation of the truce. The English were urged to release the ship and restore their goods to them, or alternatively pay suitable recompense.

There is no record of Hamilton's death, though it is possible that he was one of the prisoner fatalities at the Battle of Homildon Hill in 1402, where a Sir John Hamilton, elder, appears on a list of captives.

== Marriage and children ==
John Hamilton married Jacoba Douglas, sister of Sir James Douglas, 1st Lord Dalkeith, prior to 1388. It was thought that he had three sons & a daughter by her:

- James Hamilton of Cadzow
- David Hamilton of Dalserf
- Walter Hamilton of Raploch
- Catherine Hamilton of Cadzow

Preceded by David Hamilton	Baron of Cadzow c. 1392–c. 1402	Succeeded by James Hamilton
