= Walter fitz Gilbert of Cadzow =

Scottish nobleman

Sir Walter fitz Gilbert de Hameldone of Cadzow, 1st Laird (Lord) of Cadzow (died ca. 1346) was a Scottish nobleman. The husband to Mary Gordon of Huntly, they wed in 1308 in Cadzcow, Lanarkshire, Scotland (the exact date is unknown). He is the first historically confirmed progenitor of the House of Hamilton, which includes the Dukes of Hamilton, Dukes of Abercorn and Earls of Haddington.

== Origins ==
There is some confusion as to the ancestry of his grandfather, William de Hameldone, who could, it has been argued, be descended from the Umfraville family of Northumberland or the Beaumont Earls of Leicester. Both assertions are based on armorial evidence (both families used Cinquefoils in their arms), and references to various Hamilton place-names in Northumberland and Leicestershire. The Leicester connection is considered more likely as Robert de Beaumont, 3rd Earl of Leicester is known to have had a son William but Heraldry expert A.C. Fox Davies has suggested the early Beaumont Earls of Leicester bore the arms Gules, a lion rampant queue-fourchee argent following the work of Sir Anthony Wagner's History of Heraldry of Britain who cited the Great Coucher Book of the Duchy of Lancaster.

Bruce A. McAndrew, in his work, Scotland's Historical Heraldry, argues for the Umfraville connection:

The earliest representation of the Hamilton arms appears on the Bute Mazer, where Gules, three cinquefoils ermine, presumably for Walter fitzGilbert, is accompanied by Gules, a chevron ermine between three cinquefoils for brother John (d 1328). On the basis of these arms, it has been customary to trace the Hamilton origins to Robert fitzPernel, Earl of Leicester (d1204), who bore a single cinquefoil ermine to the Hamiltons' three. However, no genealogical evidence supports this assumption and a more sensible proposition is that they were kin, or vassals of the Umfraville lords of Redesdale and the earls of Angus (1247-1321) and took their name from Hameldon in Northumberland. Indeed, it is stated that a Walter fitzGilbert married Emma de Umfraville in the 13th century and of course other client Umfraville families like Swinburne and Clenell likewise bore the cinquefoils.

McAndrew also cites the work of J. Bain's, "Walter fitz Gilbert, ancestor of the Dukes of Hamilton," who further suggested that "Walter de Burghdon (Boroudoun), whose earlier seal attached to the Ragman Roll display a single cinquefoil and whose later seals display three cinquefoils, was identical with Walter fitzGilbert of Hameldone. Bain, of course, was not aware of the painted heraldric evidence that demonstrated that Walter de Burghdon (d1309) bore Argent, three cinquefoils sable when fighting in the Scottish Wars and his relative Gilbert de Burradoun bore Gules, on a bend argent, three cinquefoils sable in the Parliamentary Roll"

== Documentary evidence ==
Walter fitz Gilbert first appears as a witness to a charter of James Stewart, 5th High Steward of Scotland granting land to the monks of Paisley Abbey in 1294, and also later in the year in another granting land to the same establishment. The other signatories were all minor landowners in Renfrewshire. Fitz Gilbert was present at Berwick Castle to sign the Ragman Roll, alongside the majority of other Scots Nobility, at the behest of Edward I of England. He is styled on that document as "Wauter fiz Gilbert de Hameldone".

The arms of fitz Gilbert are represented on the Bute mazer, a drinking cup exhibited in the National Museum of Scotland, that been dated to soon after Bannockburn, and was possibly commissioned by him. The National Museum of Scotland suggest that Walter fitz Gilbert may have been the brother of John fitz Gilbert probable Baillie of Bute.

A much later writer, in the sixteenth century, Friar Mark Hamilton recorded family traditions about Walter fitz Gilbert and the origins of the family.

== Wars of Scottish Independence ==
During the risings of William Wallace, and later Robert the Bruce, Walter fitz Gilbert remained loyal to the English party, holding lands in Fife of King Edward. By 1314 he was constable of Bothwell Castle in South Lanarkshire and was charged by Edward with its security:

The king commands Walter fitz Gilbert, constable of his castle of Bothwell to see that it is safely and securely kept, and delivered to no other person whatsoever, without the king’s letters patent under the Great Seal of England directed to himself.

Following the defeat of Edward II of England at the Battle of Bannockburn, a sizable party of English noblemen under the Earl of Hereford fled to Bothwell Castle. The party included Robert de Umfraville, Earl of Angus, Maurice, Lord of Berkleley, John, Lord of Segrave, and Anthony de Lacy. Walter fitz Gilbert admitted Hereford and his party. Once inside, he made them all prisoners and went over to the Scots.

== Later life ==
Joining the Bruce party, Walter fitz Gilbert was granted lands of Dalserf, previously owned by the Comyn faction, and was later rewarded with the barony of Cadzow and Cadzow Castle on the banks of the Clyde. He was a Justice of Lanark in 1321, and was knighted the following year. In 1323 he was granted the lands of Kinneil, Larbert and Auldcathy in present-day West Lothian, and Kirkcowan in Wigtownshire.

Walter fitz Gilbert was present at the Battle of Halidon Hill in 1333, fighting in the division of the High Steward, (later Robert II of Scotland), but is thought to have escaped the carnage there. There is little else heard of him. He died prior to 1346, when his son David fought at the Battle of Neville's Cross as Laird of Cadzow.

== Marriage and issue ==
Walter fitz Gilbert married Mary Gordon, daughter of Sir Adam Gordon of that Ilk, ancestor of the Earls of Huntly, in 1308. By her, he had two sons:

- David fitz Walter of Cadzow de Hameldone, ancestor of the Dukes of Hamilton and Dukes of Abercorn
- John fitz Walter de Hameldone, ancestor of the Earls of Haddington and the Hamiltons of Innerwick

| Preceded by New creation | Baron of Cadzow c.1315/1320–c.1346 | Succeeded by David fitz Walter |

== Notes ==
=== Sources ===
- Balfour Paul, Sir James, The Scots Peerage Vol IV. Edinburgh 1907
