= Kinneil House =

Coordinates: 56.0071°N 3.6342°W

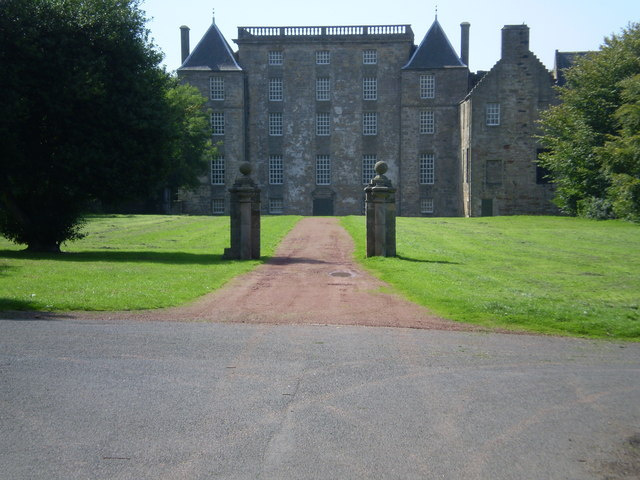
- Interactive map of Kinneil House
- Location: Bo'ness, Scotland

History
- Built: 1553
- Built for: James Hamilton, 2nd Lord Hamilton, 1st Earl of Arran

Site notes
- Governing body: Historic Environment Scotland

Kinneil House is a historic house to the west of Bo'ness in east-central Scotland. It was once the principal seat of the Hamilton family in the east of Scotland. The house was saved from demolition in 1936 when 16th-century mural paintings were discovered, and it is now in the care of Historic Environment Scotland. The house now consists of a symmetrical mansion built in 1677 on the remains of an earlier 16th- or 15th-century tower house, with two rows of gunloops for early cannon still visible. A smaller east wing, of the mid 16th century, contains the two painted rooms. The house is protected as a Category A listed building.

It sits within a public park, which also incorporates a section of the Roman Antonine Wall and the only example of an Antonine fortlet with visible remains.

== Early history ==
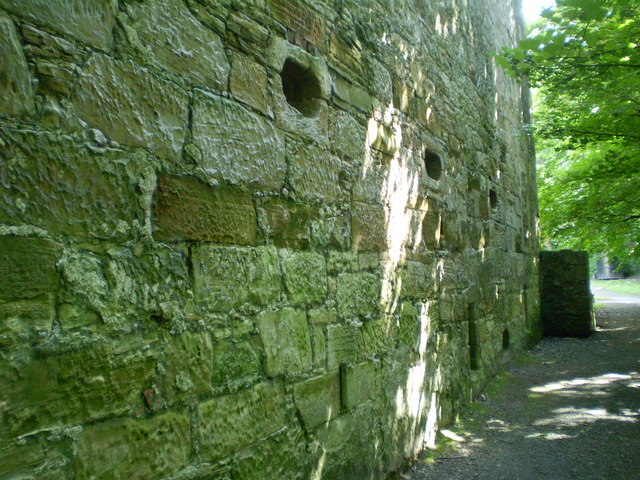
16th-century Gunloops face the ravine to the West

The lands of Kinneil with Larbert and Auldcathy were given to Walter Fitz Gilbert, an ancestor of the Hamilton family, by Robert the Bruce in 1323. A charter of 1474 mentions the castle of "Kynneil called Craig Lyown", lands to be reclaimed from the sea, and saltpans which added to the estate income. The Castle of Lyon may have been near the sea at Snab Brae, and is remembered by the name of Castleloan housing estate. There was a deer park at Kinneil from an early date, and in November 1503 James IV sent a man to bring deer nets from Kinneil to Falkland Palace. James IV came to Kinniel in July 1508 to see Lord Hamilton's horses.

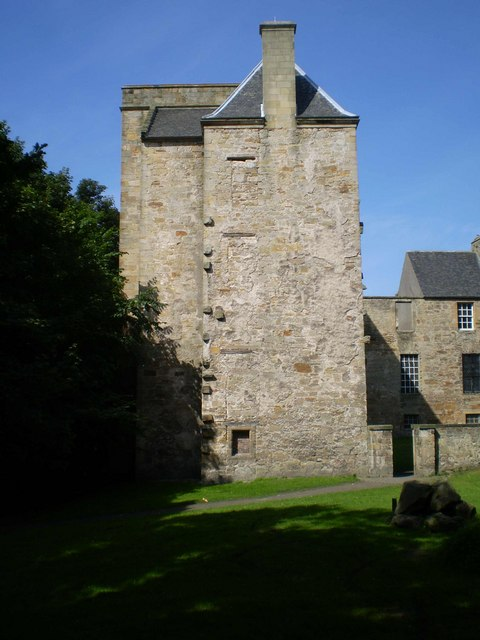
South facade of Kinneil House

Parts of an older castle, which replaced the castle at the Snab may be incorporated in the present building. James Hamilton, 1st Earl of Arran died at Kinneil in 1529, but wished to be buried at Hamilton. The presence of the former parish church close to the west of the palace across a narrow ravine suggests the early use of the site. The church is now a roofless ruin. The west gable survives. One of its bells, which appears to date from the 15th century, is preserved in the nearby Kinneil Museum and has an incomplete inscription in Lombardic capitals: "EN : KATARINA : VOCOR : VT : PER : ME : VIRGINIS ALME", which may be translated as "Lo, Katherine I am called, that by me of the Blessed Virgin ...". It is supposed that the bell was one of a pair and the inscription continued on the other. A large stone cross from the church is kept with the palace.

== Regent Arran ==
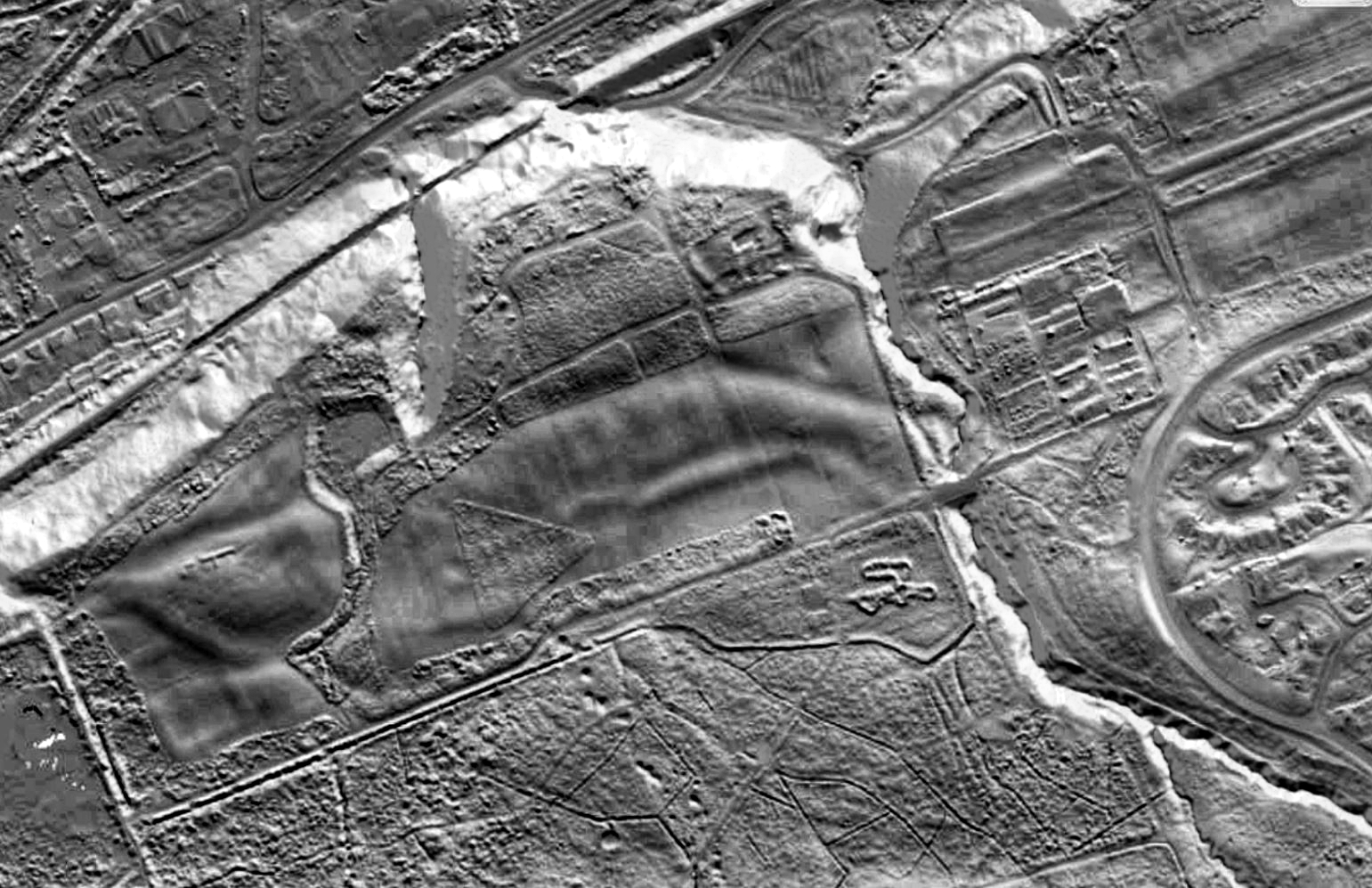
A lidar view of Kinneil House (upper right) and the site of the Roman fortlet (lower left) on the Antonine Wall

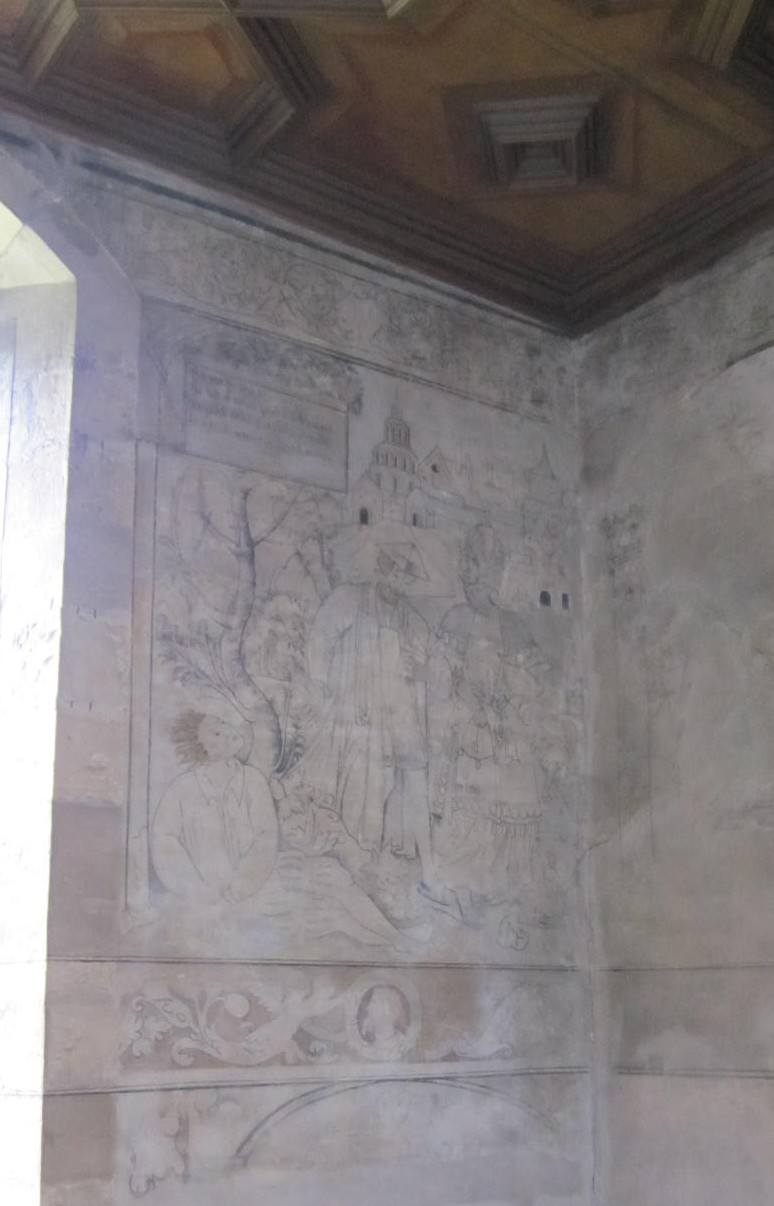
Wall painting in Parable Room

The east wing of the surviving building, and perhaps the earlier tower with wide-mouthed gunloops, was built by James Hamilton, 2nd Earl of Arran (c.1516–1575). He was the Governor or Regent of Scotland on the death of James V of Scotland. Coal was shipped from Kinneil to Leith for Edinburgh Castle, and timber for repairing Arran's chamber at "Craig Lyon" came from Leith in May 1545. Arran's wife, Margaret Douglas, came to Kinneil in December 1546. Arran visited and stayed with her in February 1547. The household books call the house "Kynnele" and also use the old name "Craig Lyon".

Some payments for building at Kinneil were recorded in the royal treasurer's accounts; timber for roofing, floors and panelling was sent by boat from Leith in 1549 and 1550 to complete one section. Around this time Friar Mark composed a "History of the Hamiltons" for Regent Arran which connects his heraldry to an incident at Kinneil or "Borough Muir".

The garden or "yaird" was improved for the Spring of 1553, by planting hedges, marjoram, and lettuce. Trees were brought from Fife and Strathearn. In September 1553, Arran gave a gift of 44 shillings to masons laying the foundation stones of another part of the Palace. One of the masons was Thomas Bargany, who was given tips called "drinksilver" and a bonus of £12 Scots to buy clothes. The well for the house or castle is now concealed under the floor of the east wing. At this time John Scrimgeour of Myres was royal master of work or architect, while Dean John Sclater was master of work at Hamilton and possibly Arran's other houses.

The 16th-century painted interior decoration and a stone armorial carry Arran's ducal coronet, and the collar of the Order of Saint Michael, French honours he received in 1548. An armorial stone has the Hamilton motto, the woodsman's cry, "Through!", and the arms of his wife, Margaret Douglas, with her motto "Lock Sickar", meaning secure or steadfast. The stone was formerly set on the north pavilion of the main block, and is now displayed with other carved stones in a cellar. One of the painted rooms has decoration that evokes verdure tapestry with vignettes of Samson and Delilah, Abraham and Isaac, and David and Bathsheba and The Temptation of St. Anthony; this vaulted room is now called the Arbour Room. The other room has scenes from the Parable of the Good Samaritan, Lucretia, Saint Jerome and Mary Magdalene. The original use of this suite of rooms is unknown, although they were probably the principal bed chambers. The name of the painter seems be unrecorded, and it has been suggested a French painter in Edinburgh, Guillaume, was involved. The subjects of these paintings allude to the Power of Women, perhaps a political reference to Mary of Guise, Mary Queen of Scots and the two Tudor Queens of England.

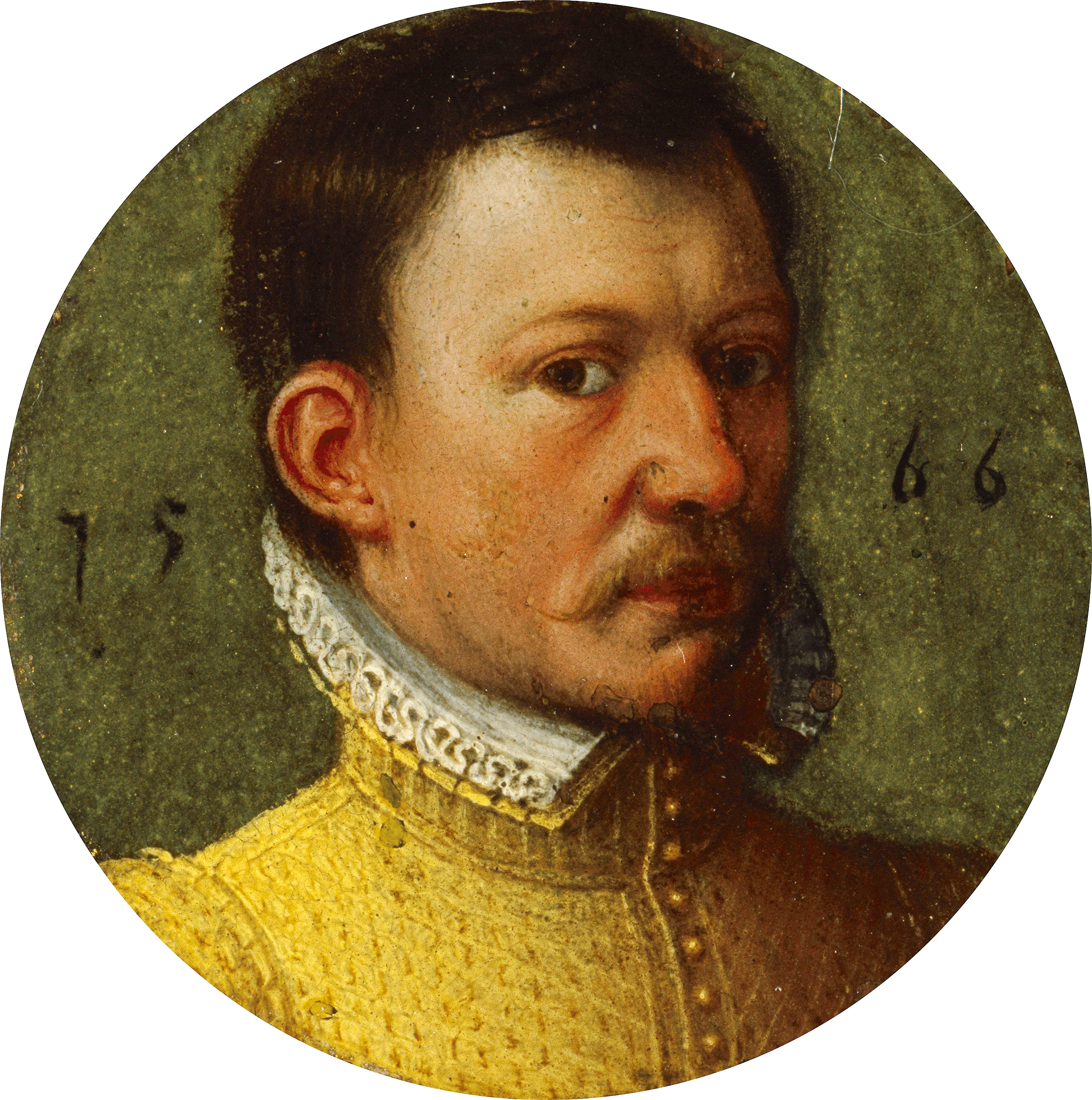
The Earl of Bothwell came to Kinniel at Easter 1562

The house was empty on 4 February 1560 when French troops led by d'Oysel attacked and burnt it. In 1562 James Hepburn, Earl of Bothwell came to Kinneil to make his peace with James Hamilton, 3rd Earl of Arran. It was said that Bothwell proposed they kidnap Mary, Queen of Scots and imprison her in Dumbarton Castle and kill her half-brother Lord James Stewart and her secretary William Maitland of Lethington. A few day later, on Easter Day, the Earl of Arran, who suffered from mental ill health, escaped from his worried father and bedchamber at Kinneil using sheets as a rope. The drop was 30 fathoms. He made his way to Falkland Palace to speak with the queen and reveal the plot. Some, like William Douglas of Lochleven, thought he was motivated by his friendship for Lord James. The incident was described in a chronicle: "And upon the xxix of Merche 1562, my lord of Arrane came furth of the palice of Kynneill, on ane fransy in the nycht, at ane heich wyndo, and past to the quenis grace at Falkland".

After the Battle of Corrichie in October 1562, Arran's father, the Duke of Châtellerault was the reluctant keeper of George Gordon at Kinneil, the forfeited heir of the Earl of Huntly.

== James VI of Scotland ==
Regent Lennox damaged the house in May 1570 with gunpowder and spoiled the lands after the assassination of Regent Moray at Linlithgow by a Hamilton. Lennox was assisted by an English force commanded by William Drury and they also burnt houses at Pardovan, Binny, and Kingscavil.

James VI reduced the power of the Hamiltons by military force in 1579, and the Duke's wife, Margaret Douglas, and daughter Jean Hamilton, Countess of Eglinton, were brought to Kinneil from Craignethan Castle. In 1581 the king gave their estates and titles to James Stewart. The new Earl gifted a site for a new salt pan at Bo'ness to one of his servants, James Quhyte or White. Arran often resided at Kinneil until after his own fall in the autumn of 1585, when he remained at Kinneil under house-arrest, and for a time Kinneil was called Arran House.

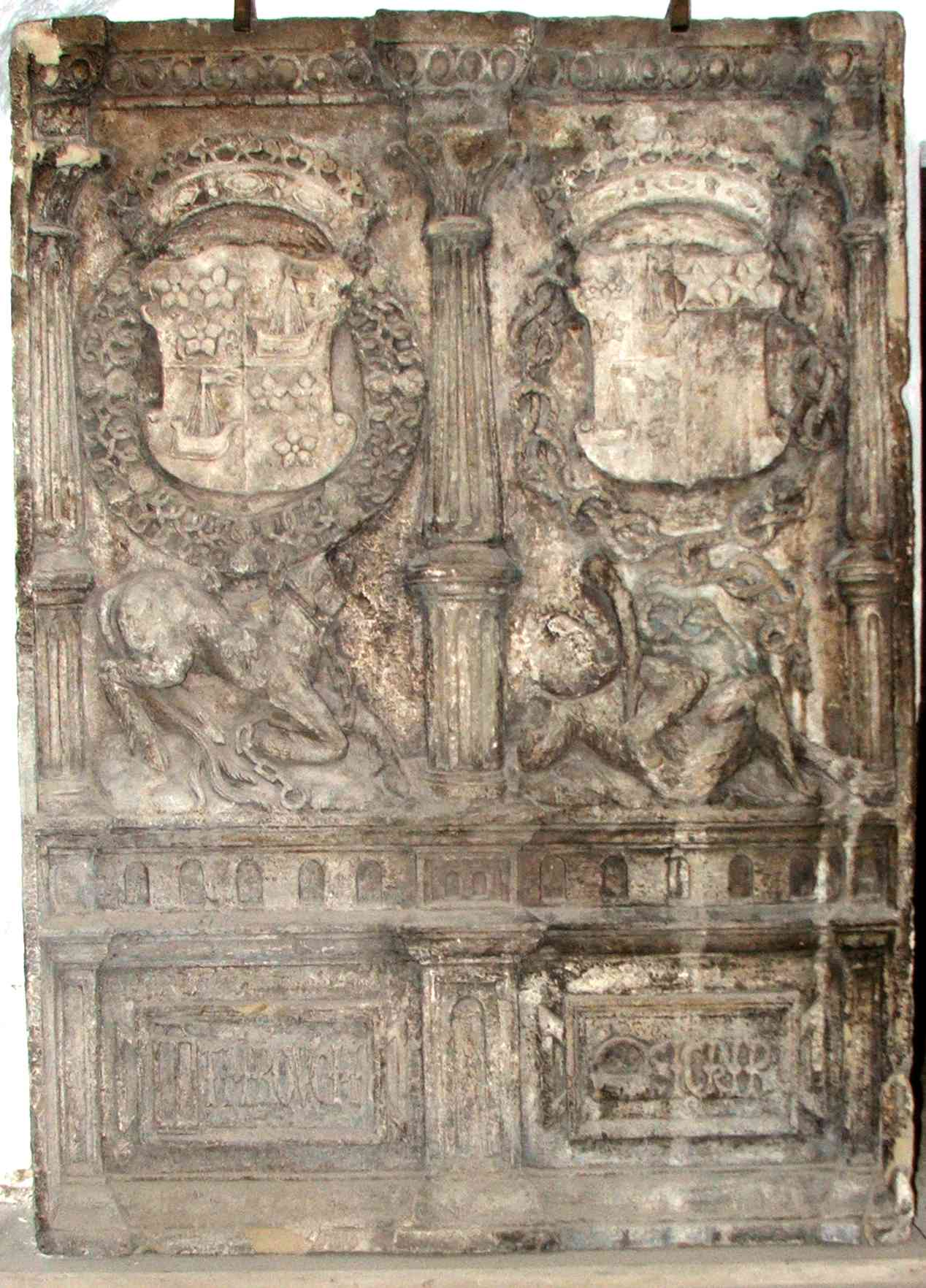
Armorial stone of the Duke and Margaret Hamilton, Kinneil House, c.1550, in Renaissance style

James VI of Scotland stayed in May 1582, to receive an envoy, Signor Paul, sent by the Duke of Guise with a gift of horses and gunpowder. The visit was controversial because Paul was known to have been involved in the St. Bartholomew's Day massacre. (Some sources say Paul was received at Dalkeith Palace)

The Earl of Arran's enemies alleged that he and the Esmé Stewart, 1st Duke of Lennox frequented Kinneil and Dalkeith with their unsuitable companions. After the Raid of Ruthven, the Earl of Arran was confined at Kinneil. When the Ruthven regime collapsed, James VI came to banquet at Kinneil with Arran on 11 November 1583. On 14 November, Ludovic Stewart son of the King's favourite Esmé Stewart arrived from France at Leith and was taken to Kinneil to meet the King. In April 1584 the captive Earl of Gowrie was brought to Kinneil from Edinburgh by Colonel William Stewart. He stayed five days and was then taken to Stirling for trial and beheaded.

James Stewart, Earl of Arran, returned to Kinneil House for a time in 1585. A messenger brought him a legal summons raised by John Kincaid of Warriston. The messenger saw the Earl on the "green of Kinneil" on 5 September, but was not allowed to speak to him in person. James Stewart, Earl of Arran, was ordered to remain at Kinneil by James, as he was suspected of involvement in an incident on the border when Francis, Lord Hunsdon, was killed.

King James VI held court at Kinneil again at Christmas-time in 1588 as the guest of John Hamilton, Commendator of Arbroath. He played at the "maye", possibly the card-game "maw" now called "Forty-fives" or a long game resembling a form of Whist, with his English courtier, Roger Aston. He told Aston that the more he did to please Elizabeth the less regard she had of him. The Earl of Huntly, the Earl of Crawford and the Chancellor, John Maitland, were present. Elsewhere, James VI was recorded playing other card and dice games, including "mont" and "mumchance".

== Later history ==
The Arbour Room was redecorated c.1620 for James Hamilton, 2nd Marquess of Hamilton and his wife Ann Cunningham and the "shakefork" and rabbit supporters of Cunningham heraldry can still be seen. This painting was almost certainly the work of Valentine Jenkin, described as an Englishman, a burgess of Glasgow and painter of the Chapel Royal at Stirling Castle.

In October 1641 the Earl of Argyll, Marquess of Hamilton and Earl of Lanark were forced to flee from Edinburgh to Kinneil due to a conspiracy known as the Incident. They were said to be 10 miles from Edinburgh, at "Lady Marquises Hamilton mothers".

When Anne Cunningham died in 1644, she left Kinneil with its new tapestries and the furnishings she had made to her son, James, 1st Duke of Hamilton. She had laboured to make the coal mines and salt pans profitable and urged him to employ faithful servants and never put it out of his own hand.

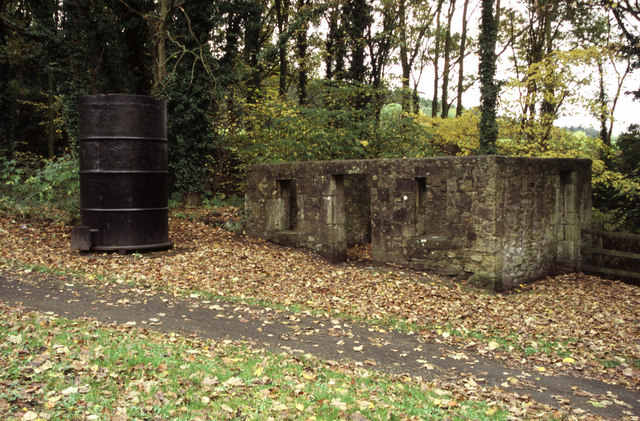
James Watt's workshop beside Kinneil House

The main house was rebuilt by William Douglas, 3rd Duke of Hamilton in 1677 with a uniform facade and a pair of stone staircases at the ends. He sent his plans to help William Douglas, 1st Duke of Queensberry with his building works, which included Drumlanrig Castle in Dumfriesshire and Queensberry House in Edinburgh. An inventory of 1688 gives the names of rooms in the now gutted main house. The front door opened into a Laich Hall, and a grand stair to the south led to the dining room above. A similar arrangement can still be seen at the contemporary Argyll's Lodging, Stirling.

In 1700 the new Duchess of Hamilton, Elizabeth Gerard, came to stay at Kinneil. James Hamilton, 4th Duke of Hamilton ordered that the "two pavilions be whitened, as the body of the house is".

But family use of the house declined, as income from the mines and port increased. In the late 18th century, Dr John Roebuck, founder of the Carron Iron Works lived at Kinneil House, during which time the engineer James Watt worked at perfecting his steam engine, in a cottage adjacent to the house. Between 1809 and 1828 the 9th Duke gave the philosopher Dugald Stewart use of the house.

By 1936 the Hamiltons had abandoned the house, and Bo'ness Town Council were demolishing it when Stanley Cursiter, director of the National Galleries of Scotland, heard that wall paintings had been discovered. The Ministry of Works quickly secured the wing with the paintings, and recovered the oak ribbed ceiling of the Parable Room. The paintings were restored, and the whole building is now in the care of Historic Environment Scotland.

== Ghost ==
The house is reportedly haunted by a White Lady, believed to be the ghost of Lady Alice who killed herself by leaping from the building in the 17th century to escape her cruel husband. Lady Alice or Ailie was traditionally supposed to haunt the nearby glen of the Gil Burn. The ghost story was recorded by Maria Edgeworth in June 1823. She observed that the building was "an old but white-washed castle-mansion", this being the traditional Scottish lime harling that can still be seen in patches today. Her host Helen D'Arcy Stewart told her about "Lady Lilyburn" who flutters on top of the castle and leaps into the sea, or stomps around the house in boots frightening the maids. Alice's name "Lilyburn" seems to derive from a Commonwealth soldier, Colonel Robert Lilburne, who briefly possessed some Hamilton lands.

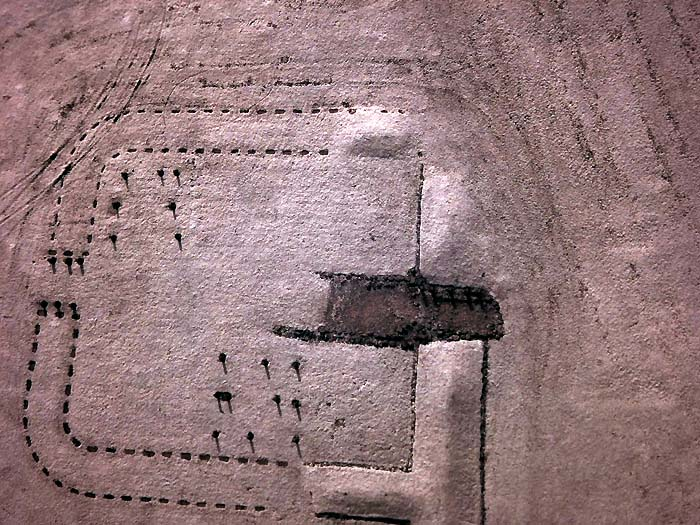
Near infra-red kite aerial photo of Kinneil Roman Fortlet

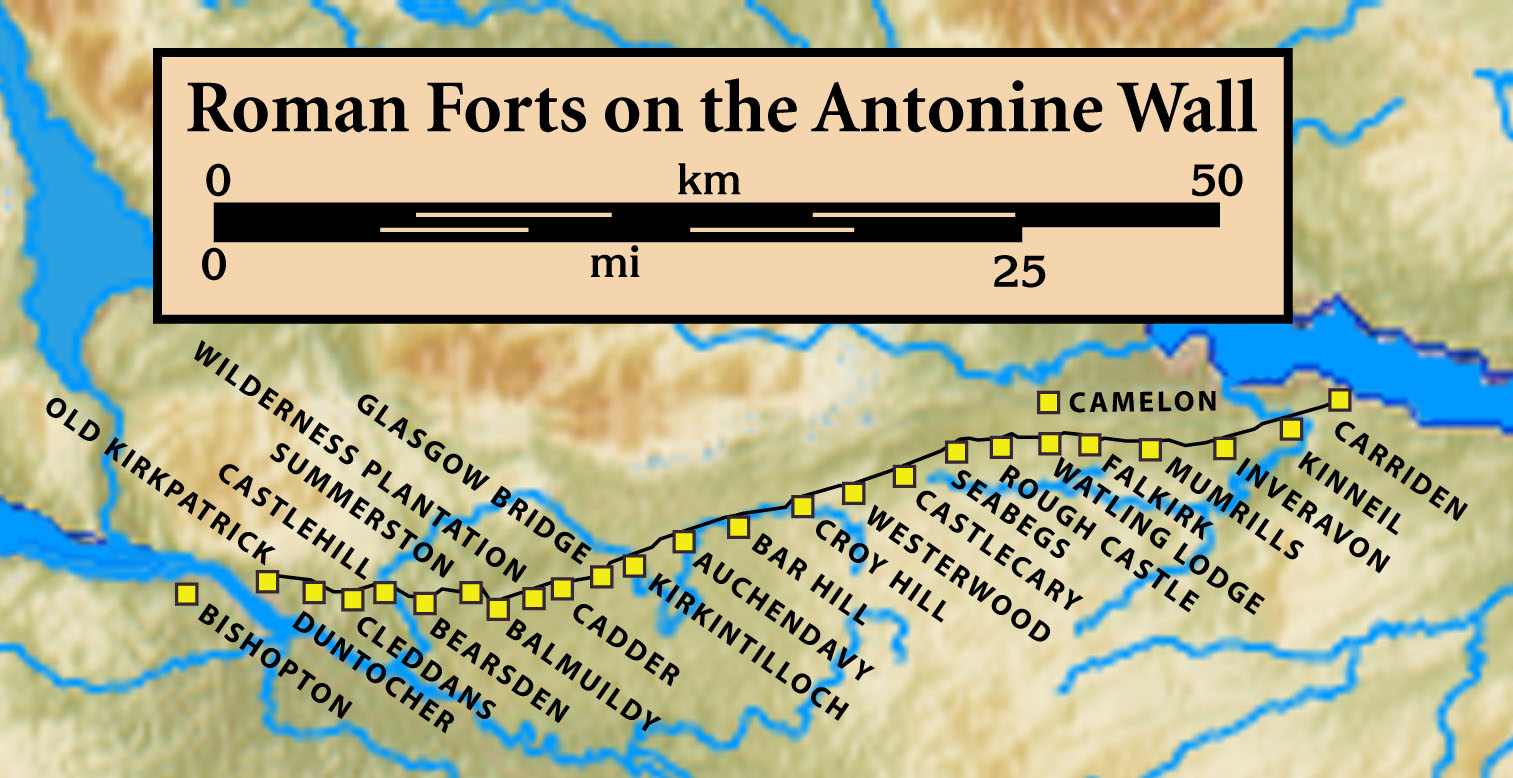
Forts and Fortlets associated with the Antonine Wall from west to east: Bishopton, Old Kilpatrick, Duntocher, Cleddans, Castlehill, Bearsden, Summerston, Balmuildy, Wilderness Plantation, Cadder, Glasgow Bridge, Kirkintilloch, Auchendavy, Bar Hill, Croy Hill, Westerwood, Castlecary, Seabegs, Rough Castle, Camelon, Watling Lodge, Falkirk, Mumrills, Inveravon, Kinneil, Carriden

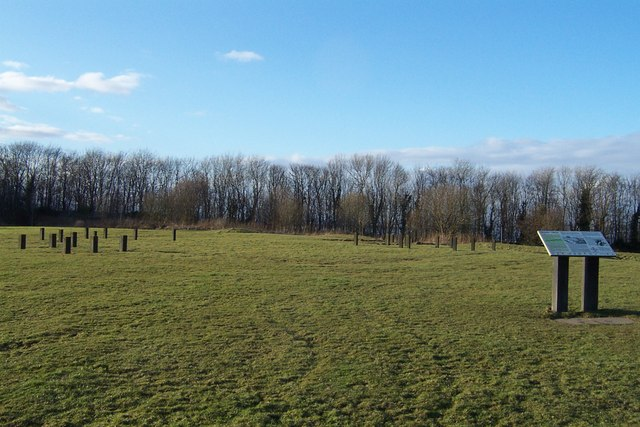
Kinneil Fortlet on the Antonine Wall

== The Antonine Wall ==
Historically it was thought that there may have been a Roman Fort near Kinneil House. Sir George Macdonald speculated about a fortlet near the house.

In July 1961 two sites in Bo’ness were excavated. This followed on from previous excavations carried out in 1960 which were sponsored by the Inspectorate of Ancient Monuments, Ministry of Public Building and Works. The first site was located in a field near Kinneil House. The excavation revealed laid firestone blocks which once formed part of the wall base. These were partially destroyed with only one kerbstone still remaining.

In the 1970s a Roman fortlet was located and two timber buildings. A short section of the Antonine rampart has been reconstructed. Kinneil has the only visible example of an Antonine fortlet available today. Among the finds at the site a Roman horse harness loop was found. A digital reconstruction of the fortlet has been created.

A detailed video of the copper alloy harness fitting is available online. A fine leather shoe from the fortlet has also been digitally reconstructed. A single Roman coin was also found.

In 1973 an arched stone tunnel 4 foot by 7 foot was discovered running from a southerly position aprox 100 feet to the western gable of the house.

In 2018, nine trenches were opened at Kinneil. These revealed the remains of a metalled surface, well preserved in one trench, which were possibly part of the Military Way.
