= Anne Hamilton, Countess of Huntly =

Scottish noblewoman (c. 1535–1574)

Anne Hamilton
- Countess of Huntly
- Born: c. 1535; Scotland
- Died: after 17 April 1574
- Noble family: Hamilton
- Spouse: George Gordon, 5th Earl of Huntly
- Issue: Lady Jean Gordon; George Gordon, 6th Earl of Huntly; Alexander Gordon; William Gordon
- Father: James Hamilton, Duke of Châtellerault, 2nd Earl of Arran
- Mother: Lady Margaret Douglas
- Occupation: Lady-in-Waiting; Maid of Honour

Anne Hamilton, Countess of Huntly (c. 1535 – after 17 April 1574), was a Scottish noblewoman and a member of the powerful Hamilton family which had a strong claim to the Scottish crown. Her father James Hamilton, Duke of Châtellerault, 2nd Earl of Arran was heir presumptive to the throne of Scotland after Mary, Queen of Scots prior to the birth of the latter's son Prince James in 1566. Anne was the wife of George Gordon, 5th Earl of Huntly, Lord Chancellor of Scotland and a chief conspirator during the reign of Queen Mary.

In her teens, Anne entered Marie of Guise's household as a lady-in-waiting and maid-of-honour.

== Family ==
Lady Anne was born in Scotland in about 1535, the eldest daughter of James Hamilton, Duke of Châtellerault, 2nd Earl of Arran and Lady Margaret Douglas. Her paternal grandparents were James Hamilton, 1st Earl of Arran, and Lady Janet Beaton, and her maternal grandparents were James Douglas, 3rd Earl of Morton, and Catherine Stewart, illegitimate daughter of King James IV of Scotland by his mistress Marion Boyd. The Hamiltons were, next to the legitimate royal Stewarts, the noblest family in Scotland, and therefore the strongest claimants to the throne due to Anne's great-grandfather James Hamilton, 1st Lord Hamilton having been the husband of Princess Mary Stewart, the sister of King James III. From the time of the death of John Stewart, Duke of Albany in 1536 until the birth of James Stewart, Duke of Rothesay in 1450; from April 1541 when the infant Rothesay died along with his new-born brother, Arthur until the birth of Queen Mary on 8 December 1542; and then following the death of King James V on 14 December 1542 until the birth of Queen Mary's son, Prince James in 1566, Anne's father was the heir presumptive to the Kingdom of Scotland. When Mary abdicated in 1567 in favour of her son James, he once again became next in line to the throne until his own death on 22 January 1575.

Anne had three younger sisters and five brothers, including James Hamilton, 3rd Earl of Arran, John Hamilton, 1st Marquess of Hamilton, and Claud Hamilton, 1st Lord Paisley. James, who was declared legally insane on 9 April 1562, had aspired to marry Queen Mary, and at one point in 1562, there was a rumour spread throughout the realm that he had planned to abduct her. Although the rumour proved false, the eccentric James would, throughout his life, nurse a neurotic obsession for his royal cousin.

== Early life ==
On the infant Queen Mary's accession to the throne, Anne's father, James Hamilton, Earl of Arran, became Regent of Scotland until 1554, when he surrendered the post to Mary's mother Mary of Guise. Mary of Guise visited France in 1551. On her return in December, Anne was bought magnificent clothes to join Guise's household as a lady-in-waiting and maid of honour. The clothes included; a grey velvet gown; a crimson velvet gown with gold passementerie; four hoods and sets of sleeves; red stockings; with a sponge, a rubbing brush and a pair of knives. Her father had already bought her several fine gowns, made by John Anderson, all paid for from the royal exchequer.

Anne was ill in March and April 1552. She recovered, perhaps with the help of drugs bought from Guise's apothecary and surgeon costing £20. At this time her servants were Effame Hamilton, Gilbert Ruthven and William Forrester. Effame, who was called Anne's keeper, sewed her clothes and kept the fire in Anne's chamber.

Anne's older sister Barbara Hamilton married Alexander Gordon, Lord Gordon. Lady Anne went to Falkland Palace in June. Anne travelled with Mary of Guise to the west of Scotland in October 1553, accompanied by her servant John Forstar. Her sister Lady Gordon also joined this progress to Glasgow and Whithorn.

Soon after, their father resigned the regency to Mary of Guise, and thereafter the Crown records no longer documented Anne's expenses.

== Marriage and issue ==
On 12 March 1558, Lady Anne married George Gordon, 5th Earl of Huntly, son of George Gordon, 4th Earl of Huntly and Elizabeth Keith. He would become one of the chief conspirators in the realm during the reign of Queen Mary.

Anne was described as having '"shown a mettle which outstripped that of her husband". The marriage produced four children:

- Lady Jean Gordon (died after 29 December 1615), married George Sinclair, 5th Earl of Caithness, son of John Sinclair, Master of Caithness and Jean Hepburn, by whom she had five children.
- George Gordon, 6th Earl of Huntly (1562 – 13 June 1636), married Henrietta Stewart (1573–1642), daughter of Esmé Stewart, 1st Duke of Lennox and Catherine de Balsac, by whom he had seven children, including George Gordon, 2nd Marquess of Huntly.
- Alexander Gordon (died January 1622), married Lady Agnes Sinclair.
- William Gordon, a monk.

Anne's husband was warded at Dunbar Castle following his father's rebellion and death in August 1562 at the Battle of Corrichie. His titles and estates were forfeited and his brother John Gordon was executed for treason. George Gordon, as Sheriff of Inverness Castle, had refused the queen entry to the fortress which was a royal property. He was pardoned by the queen and put into free ward at Dunbar. His estates and title of Earl of Huntly were restored to him in 1565, following Queen Mary's marriage to Henry Stuart, Lord Darnley. He obtained his full freedom in 1565, and his dignities were formally restored in 1567. He was appointed Lord Chancellor of Scotland that same year.

Anne was well regarded by Mary, Queen of Scots, and she was the only Hamilton mentioned in her will made in June 1566 before the birth of Prince James. In 1567, Anne's husband was part of the confederation of nobles who conspired to murder of Lord Darnley. The ring-leader of the conspiracy was allegedly James Hepburn, Earl of Bothwell, George's ally and the husband of his sister, Jean. George, shortly after Darnley's murder, persuaded Jean to divorce Bothwell enabling him to marry the widowed Queen Mary. He witnessed the marriage contract between the queen and Bothwell, and he was part of the retinue that accompanied the couple on their return to Edinburgh just before their wedding.

Anne's brother Claud Hamilton led the vanguard of Queen Mary's troops at the Battle of Langside but the royalists were defeated by Regent Moray's forces. Many of her relatives were slain or taken prisoner in the battle.

Anne Hamilton died sometime after 17 April 1574.

== Ancestry ==
Ancestors of Anne Hamilton, Countess of Huntly

James Hamilton of Cadzow, 5th Laird of Cadzow
James Hamilton, 1st Lord Hamilton
Janet Livingston
James Hamilton, 1st Earl of Arran
James II of Scotland
Mary Stewart, Princess of Scotland
Mary of Guelders
James Hamilton, Duke of Châtellerault, 2nd Earl of Arran
John Beaton, 6th Laird of Balfour
Sir David Beaton of Creich
Marjory Boswell
Lady Janet Beaton
Stephen Duddingston
Janet Duddingston
Anne Hamilton
James Douglas, 1st Earl of Morton
John Douglas, 2nd Earl of Morton
Joan of Scotland, Countess of Morton
James Douglas, 3rd Earl of Morton
Sir Patrick Crichton
Janet Crichton
Lady Margaret Douglas
James III of Scotland
James IV of Scotland
Margaret of Denmark
Catherine Stewart
Archibald Boyd
Marion Boyd
Christian Mure
