= James Hamilton, 3rd Earl of Arran =

Scottish earl (1537–1609)

James Hamilton
- Earl of Arran
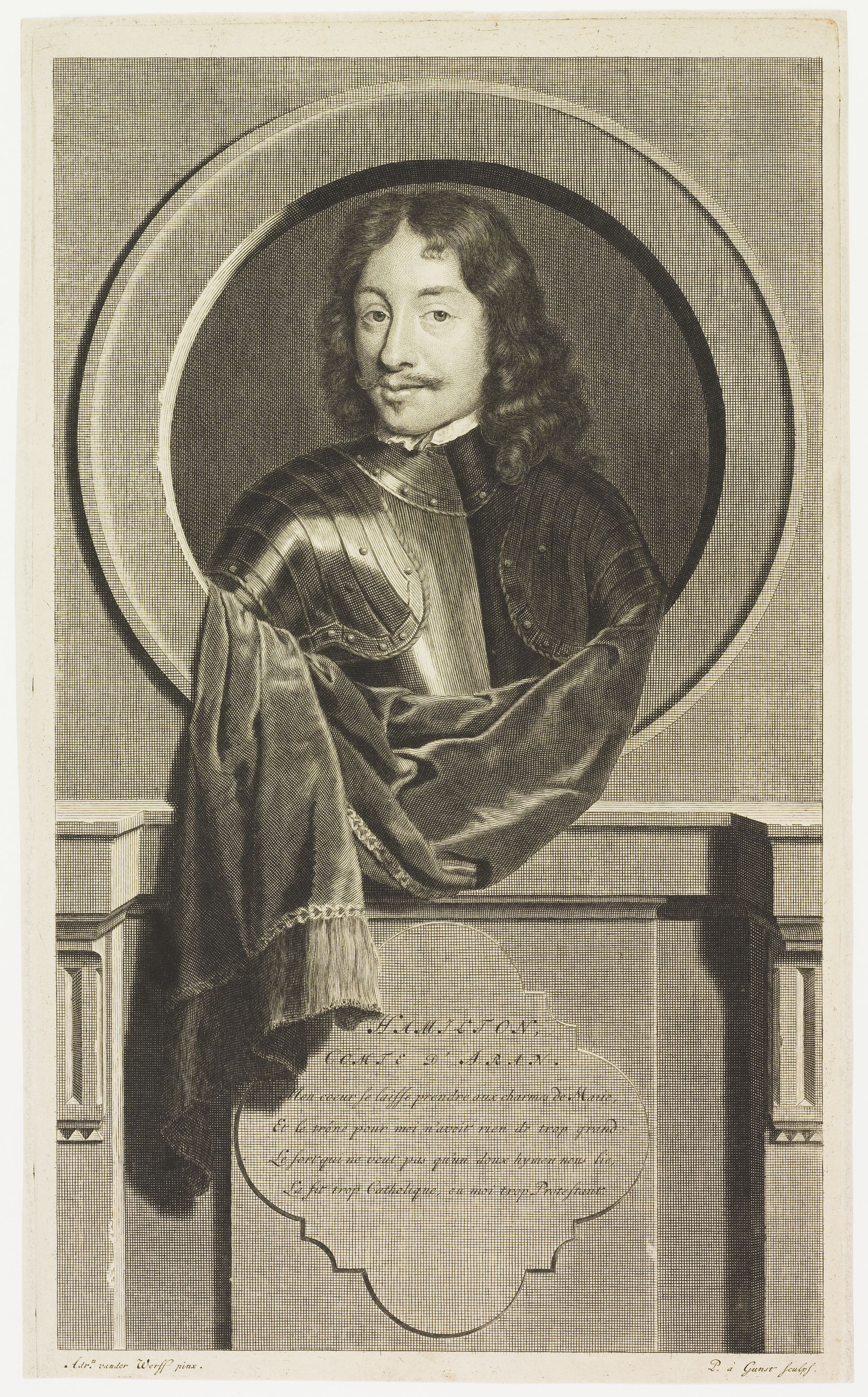
- Tenure: 1575–1609 (de jure)
- Predecessor: James, 2nd Earl of Arran
- Successor: James, 2nd Marquess of Hamilton
- Born: 1537
- Died: March 1609 (aged 71–72)
- Buried: Isle of Arran
- Father: James, 2nd Earl of Arran
- Mother: Margaret Douglas

James Hamilton, 3rd Earl of Arran (1537–1609) was a Scottish nobleman and soldier who opposed the French-dominated regency during the Scottish Reformation. He was the eldest son of James Hamilton, Duke of Châtellerault, sometime regent of Scotland. He was of royal descent, and at times was third or fourth in succession to the Scottish crown; several royal marriages were proposed for him, but he ultimately never married. He went to France with Mary, Queen of Scots, where he commanded the Scots Guards. After returning to Scotland, he became a leader of the Protestant party against Mary and her French supporters. However, he went insane in 1562 and was confined for the rest of his life.

== Family ==
James Hamilton may have been born in 1537 or 1538, another source suggests a date in 1532. His place of birth probably was Hamilton, Lanarkshire. He was the eldest son of James Hamilton, 2nd Earl of Arran and his wife Margaret Douglas. His father was created Duke of Châtellerault in France in 1548. His father also was the grandson of Mary, eldest daughter of James II and was at this time, after King James V, the most senior male descendant of James II and, so heir presumptive for much of King James V's reign.

James's mother, Margaret Douglas, was the daughter of James Douglas, 3rd Earl of Morton. She descended from James IV through an illegitimate daughter, and Joan, daughter of James I.

Family tree

James Hamilton with parents and other selected relatives. He never married.

James; 1st Earl c. 1475 – 1529	Janet; Bethune c. 1490 – c. 1522
James; 2nd Earl c. 1516 – 1575; Châtellerault	Margaret; Douglas b. c. 1510
James; 3rd Earl; 1537–1609	John; 1st Marquess; 1540–1604	Claud; 1st Lord; Paisley; 1546–1621
James; 2nd Marquess; 1589 – 1624/25	James; 1st Earl; 1575–1618
James; 1st Duke; 1606 – 1648/49	James; 2nd Earl d. c. 1670

Legend

XXX	Subject of the article	XXX	Earls of Arran
XXX	Marquesses & dukes of Hamilton	XXX	Earls of Abercorn

James listed among his brothers
He heads the list of his brothers as the eldest son:
1. James (1537–1609)
2. Gavin, died young
3. John (1540–1604), became the 1st Marquess of Hamilton
4. David (died 1611)
5. Claud Hamilton, 1st Lord Paisley (1546–1621), from whom descend the earls, marquesses, and dukes of Abercorn

James's sisters
1. Barbara, married in 1553 James Fleming, 4th Lord Fleming,
2. Jean, married Hugh Montgomerie, 3rd Earl of Eglinton in 1555.
3. Anne (c. 1535 – before April 1574), married George Gordon, 5th Earl of Huntly
4. Margaret, married Sir Alexander, eldest son of George Gordon, 4th Earl of Huntly

In 1542, James and his father were displaced in the royal succession by the birth of James V's daughter, Mary (the future Mary, Queen of Scots) - until James V died only six days later. James's father became regent for the baby queen.

== Regent Arran's marriage plans ==
The Regent proposed various royal marriages for his son, who was second in line for the crown.

In March 1543, James V's widow, Mary of Guise told the English ambassador Ralph Sadler that the Regent "mindeth to marry" her daughter Queen Mary to his son, something she was anxious to avoid. In December 1543, French envoys heard that the Regent wanted to marry James to Henry VIII's daughter Lady Elizabeth (later Elizabeth I). This may have been offered by Henry himself as a price of the Regent's allegiance, but nothing came of the proposal either. Henry wanted to marry the baby queen to his son Edward. The Regent was a Protestant, and initially supported this policy, despite widespread opposition in Scotland.

Then in 1543 the Regent became Catholic and joined the pro-French faction of Cardinal David Beaton. Henry responded with the "Rough Wooing", nine years of war to make Scotland accept the English marriage. In October 1544, James was taken to St Andrews Castle, where he was Cardinal Beaton's guest and a pledge for the alliance of the Regent and the Cardinal.

The Regent still wanted to marry Mary to James. His half-brother, John, Abbot of Paisley, met with Lord Somerville and the Earl of Angus on 28 October 1545, to get their support. Somerville's son John wrote to Mary of Guise that they would not be persuaded. Alexander Crichton of Brunstane and a diplomat in France, Johannes Sturm, also sent warnings of this marriage proposal to England. Sturm realised the marriage would hinder Anglo-French peace treaty negotiations. James remained in the Cardinal's custody. In February 1546 he was sent a book of Latin exercises and a copy of Aesop's Fables.

In 1546, a Protestant band seized St Andrews Castle and murdered the Cardinal. James was held prisoner and hostage. The Regent besieged St Andrews; the Protestants offered to give James to Henry VIII, in return for the help of an English fleet. Henry VIII was willing, but never actually sent the fleet. On 14 August 1546, the Parliament of Scotland excluded James from the royal succession (he was then third) for the duration of his captivity. Despite Henry's promises, the castle was finally taken with the help of French ships.

Regent Arran now agreed to the marriage of Mary to the Dauphin Francis, son and heir of King Henry II of France, confirmed by the Treaty of Haddington. For arranging the marriage of Mary and Francis, the Regent was made Duke of Châtellerault, and James succeeded him as Earl of Arran. He would not inherit the French title because his father forfeited it in 1559.

== In France ==
Queen Mary was sent to France in August 1548. James Hamilton went with her or shortly earlier in July. Though only a boy of 16 or younger, he was appointed captain of the royal Garde Écossaise (Scots Guard), and in 1557 distinguished himself in the defence of St. Quentin.

James was admired in France. In 1549, the Emblemata, a collection of illustrated Latin proverbs and mottos compiled by Italian jurist Andrea Alciato appeared in a new French edition. The Emblemes D'Alciat was dedicated to him. One of Arran's personal devices was a heart pierced with an arrow pointing down.

On 24 January 1553, the French royal armourer Bénédict Claye received an order for a suit of armour for James, to be delivered before 8 April 1553. The armour was decorated with engraved and gilded borders, and included a morion, a bourguignon, and accessories.

=== Montpensier marriage plan ===
In April 1548, Henry II offered Françoise, daughter of the Duke of Montpensier, as a bride for Arran. John Lesley, Bishop of Ross, was involved in negotiations for the marriage in October 1554, and there was discussion about which daughter of the Duke of Montpensier had been intended.

After Mary was betrothed to the Dauphin, a number of ladies of the court were suggested as brides for James. One was Mademoiselle de Bouillon, daughter of Henry II and his mistress Diane de Poitiers, in May 1557. She has also been identified as Antoinette de Bouillon (died 1591), a granddaughter of Guillemette de Sarrebruck and Diane de Poitiers. Other suggested brides included Claude de Rieux, Louise de Rieux (who married René, Marquis of Elbeuf), and Jeane de Savoie. But James did not marry.

== Queen Elizabeth ==
James' father gave up the Regency of Scotland in 1554, and thereafter followed a pro-English policy. It has been suggested that James was imprisoned in France as a Protestant in 1557–1558. In 1558, Châtellerault proposed the marriage of James to Queen Elizabeth I to cement an Anglo-Scottish alliance. This proposal was supported by John Knox, the leading Protestant cleric in Scotland, and by John Jewel, Bishop of Salisbury. The marriage project gained the support of the Protestant Lords of the Congregation. Bishop Jewel remained in favour of the marriage as late as June 1560, and Elizabeth's own opinion is not known.

In 1559, Châtellerault and James openly declared themselves Protestants. James returned to Scotland escorted by English diplomat Thomas Randolph and was met by Ralph Sadler in Scotland. Both of these diplomats considered themselves his friends, and in their official correspondence during the conflicts of the Scottish Reformation, they noted signs of mental instability. On 8 December 1560, Elizabeth declared her rejection of his marriage proposal to the Scottish ambassadors William Maitland, the Earl of Morton and the Earl of Glencairn. A later chronicler, David Hume of Godscroft, believed the marriage proposal was "so unprobable, and such a proposition as Morton knew would not be very acceptable to her," but it was mooted by the Parliament of Scotland.

== Journey of Monsieur de Beaufort ==
At the end of May 1559, the English ambassador in Paris, Nicholas Throckmorton, discovered that Arran had declined an invitation to join festivities and tournaments at the French court. Throckmorton knew this was important, urged secrecy, and informed Elizabeth I. When it became known, in June 1559, that his father had become a Protestant, James was at his father's French estates at Châtellerault in Poitou, perhaps at the Chateau de la Brelandiere, and became a fugitive from the French authorities. He claimed to be harvesting timber in his woodlands. Men from the Garde Écossaise were sent to Châtellerault to search for him.

James Hamilton made his way to safety in Switzerland by July, reportedly spending 15 days hiding in a wood on the way. His escape from France was masterminded by Elizabeth's counsellor William Cecil and the English ambassador in Paris, Nicolas Throckmorton. James Hamilton went first to Geneva, then to Zurich where he was the guest of Peter Martyr, and then to Lausanne. Hamilton met Thomas Randolph alias Barnaby in Lausanne. They travelled incognito to England via Flanders. In London, he stayed at Cecil's Westminster home. James Hamilton had an interview with the Queen herself in the garden at Hampton Court.

At the end of June 1559, Throckmorton wrote to Cecil describing how James had been unkindly handled in France. After James had left some of his Scots Guards had brawled with some French soldiers. One of the French commissioners charged with his arrest tried to apologise to Mary, Queen of Scots, as he was her close relation. Throckmorton heard that Mary had denounced James as an "arrant traitor," and he hoped that this news would advance pro-English policy in Scotland. Throckmorton hoped the Scottish bearer of the letter, Sandy Whytelaw, would do this, and though Whytelaw was not a friend of James's father, he would raise support for the marriage of James and Elizabeth.

Although Elizabeth was personally sympathetic to James's plight, for English policy the rescue was a step towards the objective of ending the Auld Alliance, knowing that on Arran's return his father, as "second person" of the realm of Scotland, would become leader of the Lords of the Congregation. William Cecil acknowledged Chatelherault's thanks for the rescue, writing on 24 August 1559, "this one thing I covet, to have this isle well united in concord".

The name used by James while travelling through England was "Monsieur de Beaufort". His journey to Scotland was noted in the letters of Bishop Jewel to Peter Martyr and Henry Bullinger. In their correspondence, Arran was known by the codename Crito, Randolph as Pamphilus and Elizabeth as Glycerium. The English commander at Berwick, Sir James Croft was aware of the plan by 14 June, and Ralph Sadler's servant Gregory Railton was sent to wait for James at Alnwick.

== Back in Scotland ==
James Hamilton and Thomas Randoplh were at Alnwick on 6 September 1559. They went first to the Berwick Castle and met the Scottish reformer, Henry Balnaves. After a midnight ride through the Cheviot Hills, at one or two o'clock in the morning of Sunday 10 September 1559, he arrived in Teviotdale, and was re-united with his father at Hamilton Palace. His younger brother, Lord David Hamilton, was not so fortunate. David, aged 15, was arrested on 17 July 1559. David was first imprisoned in the Château de Vincennes and transferred in March 1560 to the Château d'Amboise wrapped or "muffled" in a blanket.

== Lady Catherine Grey ==
In September 1560, Sarlabous, the French Captain of Dunbar Castle, tried to spread a rumour that Elizabeth's council had proposed an alternative marriage plan for Arran, with the English royal heiress Lady Catherine Grey, daughter of the Duchess of Suffolk.

== Valiant and Stout in the Cause ==
James joined the Lords of the Congregation and fought tirelessly against the French and Mary of Guise in the cause of the Scottish Reformation. With his cousin, Robert, Master of Maxwell, on his father's orders, he attacked Crichton Castle the home of the Earl of Bothwell, on 10 October 1559 James and his friends took money and silverware from Daldowie and on 9 November 1559 raided the Palace of the Bishop of Dunblane, taking a gold necklace belonging to Janet, Lady Fleming, and removing the Bishop and his silver to Stirling Castle and Falkland Palace. The sixty-year-old Bishop was then imprisoned at Castle Campbell until Christmas and forced to pay for his lodging. In January 1560 Arran was leading the war in Fife, writing reports to Ralph Sadler and Sir James Croft from Dysart, Wemyss, Cupar and Aberdour.

The French ambassador in England, Gilles de Noailles, reported that the Scottish rebels had told Queen Elizabeth that if they were victorious Arran would become King of Scotland by consent of Scottish lords with England as its superior kingdom. Scotland would pay England an annual fee and Elizabeth would add the arms of Scotland to her heraldry. A later English document of 1583 represents the possibility that the Scottish nobility were intent on making Arran King of Scotland, because of their dissatisfaction with Mary and her French links. The nobles were "fullie resolved to have deprived her of her government, and established the same in the eldest sonne of the Duke of Chatteleroy, the Erle of Arreyne, beinge then a gent of verie great hope and towardnes".

In January 1560, at the request of Scottish Protestants, Elizabeth sent a fleet to Scotland under the command of William Wynter. It consisted of 17 large ships belonging to the Queen, carrying a total of 3,000 men; part of the fleet was tasked with intercepting supplies from France to starve French troops in Scotland. At the end of January, Arran conferred with the English Admiral William Wynter at Burntisland, saying he was about to return to his father's lands in the West. By 4 February 1560, Fife was won over to the Congregation and pacified. Later in February, Thomas Randolph posed as a Scot to gain the confidence of a French agent at Dumbarton Castle but Arran clumsily revealed his identity.

The centre of the conflict in Scotland moved to the Siege of Leith. An English army came to the rebels' support, under the terms of the Treaty of Berwick (1560). Before the English army arrived, the French raided Glasgow and attacked the Bishop's Palace, Arran shadowed their return to Leith with 800 horse. He then joined the besiegers in the camp at Restalrig. On 4 March at Perth, he met the Earl of Huntly, who seemed likely to join the Congregation. Arran retired from the camp at Leith by 10 April, "evil at ease," to rest at Holyrood. Within a week, Arran was in control of Blackness Castle, and returned to Edinburgh for the peace negotiations after the death of Mary of Guise in June, which led to the Treaty of Edinburgh. After the Protestant religion was established by the Reformation Parliament, he went with Lord James to Dalhousie Castle and burnt church books and vestments.

== Mary again ==
The Parliament of Scotland held in August 1560, and known as the "Scottish Reformation Parliament", supported the marriage of Arran and Elizabeth I. Plans for James to marry Queen Elizabeth fizzled out in September 1560, although he wrote to Mildred Cecil that the plan still had support in Scotland. Following the death of Mary's husband Francis II of France in December 1560, James's father again tried to marry his son to Mary, as first suggested in their infancy. Mary resisted such efforts. In July 1561, Edinburgh burgh council paid Arran to maintain a guard of men at arms.

Mary returned to Scotland in August 1561. James was chosen a member of her council on her arrival, but took up a hostile attitude to the court in consequence of the practice of the Roman Catholic religion. George Buchanan, who was unsympathetic to Mary, suggested that in November 1561, she exploited young Arran's real affection for her by spreading a rumour that he planned to abduct her from Holyrood Palace to his residence, Kinneil House, to justify strengthening the royal bodyguard. Though James' father disputed the rumour, and Thomas Randolph's considering with this "great horlyburly without reason" the Queen "had never less occasion to fear, with so many papists then in the town", physical security was tightened at Holyrood.

On 17 January 1562 Arran rode from Kinneil to Linlithgow Palace to meet with Mary, Queen of Scots, and discuss how he and his father might be remunerated for their services. The queen's half-brother, James Stewart, now Earl of Mar, married Agnes Keith on 8 February 1562. Arran escorted Mary to the feasts on Shrove Tuesday at Holyrood Palace, but became ill before the triumphs or masques on the following days. A few days later it was said that Arran had spoken "irreverently" of Elizabeth, the "Queen's Majesty", and Randolph offered his opinion to the Duke that Arran had a high opinion of his own achievements, but a tendency to fail to reciprocate well-wishers, and ought to have thanked those who favoured his suite of marriage to Elizabeth. Randolph found this flaw in his behaviour "strange". Arran now wondered if he had been better off in France serving in the Royal Guard, and spent eight days in bed in Edinburgh, tormented in his imaginations.

On 28 February 1562, fearing for Arran's mental health, Randolph wrote that he "is so drowned in dreams, and so feed himself with fantasies, that either men fear that he will fall into some dangerous and incurable sickness, or play one day some mad part that will bring himself to mischief".

== Alison Craik ==
Arran had a mistress in Edinburgh, Alison Craik, who stayed in the house of a merchant Cuthbert Ramsay on the High Street. She was described by Randolph as "a good handsome wench" in December 1561. Bothwell, John Stewart, Commendator of Coldingham, and the Marquis of Elbeuf, visited the house and on a subsequent evening, after they were refused entry, they broke into the house to annoy Arran. Despite Mary's intervention, the dispute escalated into threats of violence between the Hamilton retainers and Bothwell's men.

The visitors were wearing masks, and the incident seems comparable to the practice of visiting in disguise in Italy, described as "brave maskerye" by the Elizabethan writer Thomas Hoby.

== Allegations of a conspiracy ==
The strain of all this activity caused a mental breakdown. At Easter 1562, his father confined him to his bedchamber at Kinneil House. Arran escaped using a rope made from his bedsheets, and made his way across the Forth to Hallyards Castle and then to Falkland Palace. He accused his enemy the Earl of Bothwell of conspiring to abduct Queen Mary and the Earl of Moray from the deer park at Falkland, and spoke strangely of witches and devils, and "fearing that all men round about came to kill him". He said that Margaret Erskine, mother of the queen's half-brother Lord James Stewart was a witch. He was judged insane and confined for the rest of his life.

George Buchanan thought the abduction plot was real and Arran a hero who tried to avoid implicating his father in the conspiracy. Arran was imprisoned first at St Andrews Castle, then at Edinburgh Castle where Bothwell was also held. James Stewart of Cardonald was his keeper. Randolph wrote to Arran's old ally Throckmorton that the Earls had fallen into a "cesspit of their own making." The Duke was forced to resign the keeping of Dumbarton Castle.

== Long twilight ==
Arran's expenses as a prisoner at Edinburgh Castle, where he was kept by Lord Erskine, were paid by Mary, Queen of Scots, from her income known as the "Thirds of Benefices". The cost was 40 shillings daily amounting to £732 Scots for a year. An account of his household expenses was kept by two of Mar's servants, the chaplain Andrew Hagy and Jerome Bowie. Randolph described Arran in a letter to Cecil in January 1564, saying he inclined to solitariness, in dark rooms, with little company or talk, and was suspicious of all he met. He was also troubled with jaundice. He ate little, and spent most of his time in bed, without getting sound sleep. His father came to Edinburgh in January 1565 to ask Mary for his release. She visited Arran in the castle and kissed him, but he spoke few words as an apology to ask for forgiveness, and remained a prisoner.

Arran was released from Edinburgh Castle in April 1566 and sent to Hamilton, sick and without the power of speech. He was to remain within four miles of Hamilton Castle. He may have moved because Queen Mary had taken up residence in Edinburgh Castle during her pregnancy.

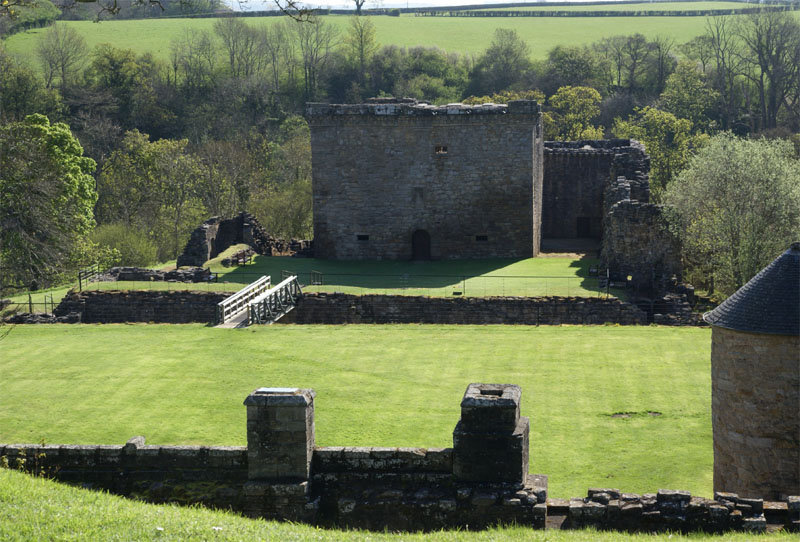
James Hamilton was kept at Craignethan Castle by his brother John, Lord Hamilton

His father died at Hamilton on 22 January 1575. He inherited his father's estate, but because of his insanity, he was placed under the care of his brother John. John and his other brother Claude, Abbot of Paisley kept Arran prisoner at Craignethan Castle, and though Henry Killigrew reported in August 1575 that if he were well-used and at liberty there was hope of recovery, he was never again allowed any freedom.

His mother, Margaret Douglas, and aunts Elizabeth Douglas (the wife of Regent Morton) and Janet or Beatrix Douglas wife of Lord Maxwell, his sister Anne (mother of the Earl of Huntly), and youngest brother David were all also affected by mental ill-health. Thomas Randolph wrote that Arran "has twice before been in the same case," and his mother and aunts were "certain times or the most part of the year distempered with an unquiet humour". Randolph's description of Arran's symptoms sound akin to modern diagnoses of mania and bipolar disorder although details of his psychological condition will remain unknown.

John and Claud were supporters of Mary Queen of Scots, and so in May 1579 the former Regent Morton seized Hamilton and Craignethan on the pretence of rescuing James from his imprisonment. John and Claud fled to England, but Arran, Lord David, and possibly their mother Margaret Douglas were taken to Linlithgow, and his estates were taken over by the government. In 1581 his Earldom was given to James Stewart (died 1595), but restored in 1585 along with his estates. Little is recorded of James in these later years: he died in 1609. and, as he was unmarried, his title passed to his nephew James, 2nd marquess.

== Further reading and external links ==
- John Durkan, 'James, Third Earl of Arran, the Hidden Years', in Scottish Historical Review, Vol. LXV, 2, no. 180, October (1986)
- Robert Kerr Hannay, 'The Earl of Arran and Queen Mary' in Scottish Historical Review, vol. 18, Glasgow (1921), 258-276 (Internet archive)
- Hastings-Robinson, ed., Zurich Letters 1558–1579, vol. 1, Parker Society, Cambridge (1842) for 'Pamphilius', 'Crito', and 'Glycerium,' see pp. 82–83.
- Joseph Stevenson, Calendar of State Papers Elizabeth, 1558-1559, vol. 1, (London, 1863)
- Marguerite Wood, 'The Imprisonment of the Earl of Arran', Scottish Historical Review, 24:94 (January 1927), pp. 116–122.
- The Kinneil House 'Great Escape', short film by the Friends of Kinneil

Peerage of Scotland
Preceded by James Hamilton	Earl of Arran; 1548–1609	Succeeded by James Hamilton
