= Joan of Scotland =

Joan of Scotland may refer to:

- Joan of England, Queen Consort of Scotland (1210–1238)
- Joan Beaufort, Queen of Scotland (c. 1404–1445)
- Joan of Scotland, Countess of Morton (c. 1428–1486)
