= Margaret Douglas, Countess of Arran =

Scottish aristocrat (died 1579)

Margaret Douglas
- Countess of Arran; Duchess of Châtellerault
- Died: 1579
- Noble family: Douglas
- Spouse: James Hamilton, Duke of Châtellerault
- Issue: James Hamilton, 3rd Earl of Arran; David Hamilton; John Hamilton, 1st Marquess of Hamilton; Claud Hamilton, 1st Lord Paisley; Anne Hamilton, Countess of Huntly; Jean Hamilton; Barbara Hamilton
- Father: James Douglas, 3rd Earl of Morton
- Mother: Catherine Stewart

Margaret Douglas, Countess of Arran and Duchess of Châtellerault was a Scottish aristocrat.

== Background ==
She was a daughter of James Douglas, 3rd Earl of Morton and Catherine Stewart, a daughter of James IV of Scotland and Marion Boyd. The couple had three daughters; Margaret, Beatrix, and Elizabeth. He was succeeded by his son-in-law, James Douglas, 4th Earl of Morton, husband of his daughter Elizabeth. She probably spent much of her childhood at Dalkeith Castle.

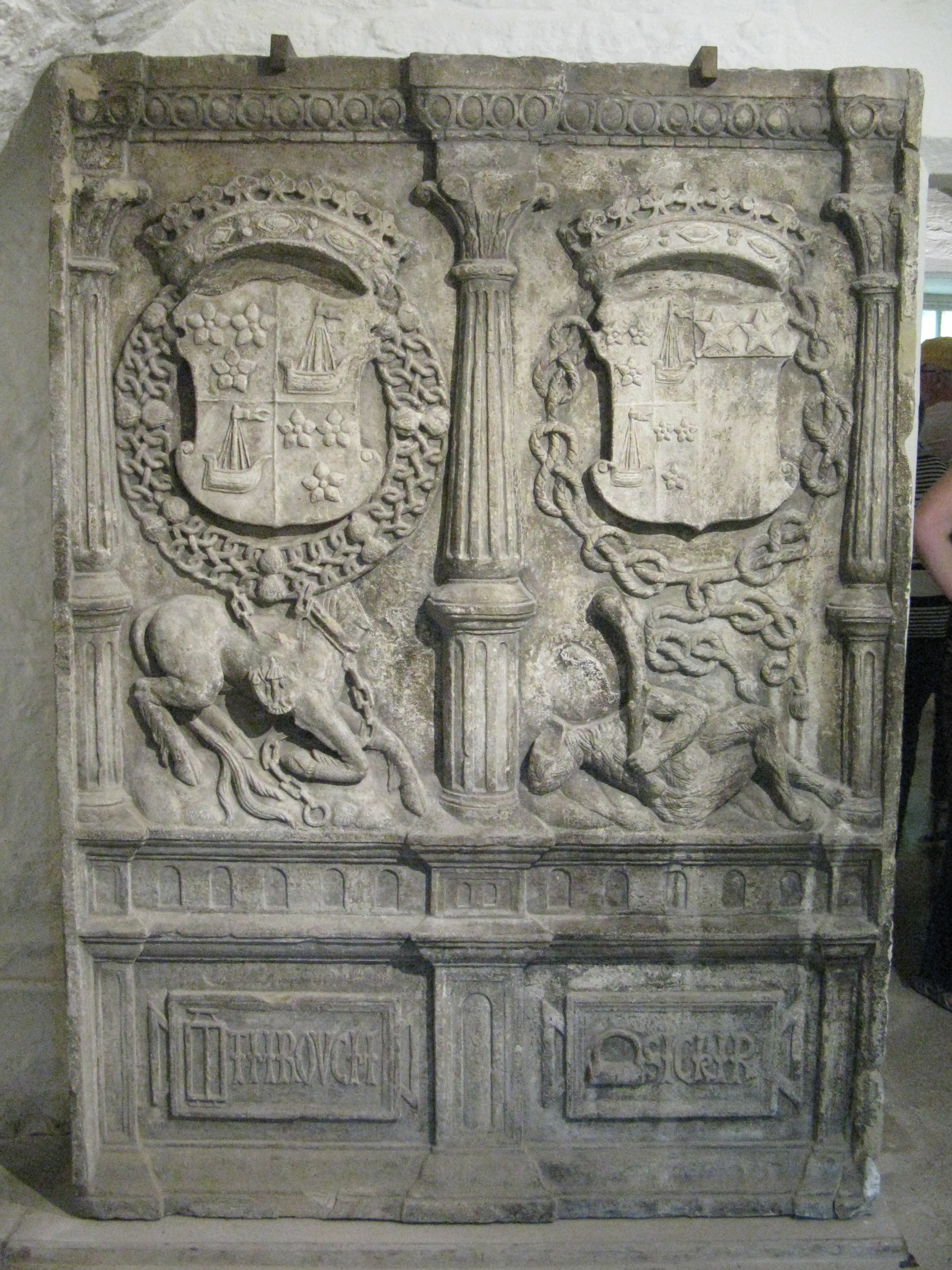
An armorial stone at Kinneil House commemorates Margaret Douglas' marriage with heraldry on the right above a wild man with a club and beneath, the Douglas motto "sickar" or secure, with a padlock

Her sister Beatrix married Robert Maxwell, 6th Lord Maxwell, and her sister Elizabeth married to James Douglas, who became the 4th Earl of Morton and Regent of Scotland. The three sisters were all affected by mental ill-health.

== Career ==
Margaret Douglas married James Hamilton, then Earl of Arran in 1532. The Earl's half-brother James Hamilton of Finnart arranged the marriage and took charge of a payment of 4000 merks from her father. She was granted Hamilton lands in West Lothian, confirmed by royal charter, including Kinneil House, Bo'ness, Inveravon, and the coal mines and salt pans on the shore.

After the death of James V of Scotland, when Mary, Queen of Scots was an infant, Arran became Regent of Scotland. The tailor Robert Spittell supplied black "dule gownis" for the mourning to five gentlewomen attendants of Margaret Douglas in January 1543. Margaret was bought a mourning cap of state, which is perhaps one of the few references to her position as wife of a premier or the "Lady Governor". Some of her clothes over the next ten years were bought using funds from the royal treasury and are recorded in the surviving accounts. These items were only a part of the costume supplied to her wardrobe over the decade, and no clothes were bought for her from the treasury funds between February 1545 and October 1549.

There were rumours in 1544 that Arran sought a divorce, and in 1545 a lawsuit is mentioned.

Margaret Douglas was probably in Edinburgh in June 1546 when her son Claude was baptised at Edinburgh Castle. She stayed at Kinneil House in December 1546. Arran stayed with her during the last week in February 1547. In September 1550 she was at Aberdour Castle.

In January 1549, John Lindsay of Dowhill delivered some of Margaret's clothes to her husband, including a purple velvet night gown with gold passementerie lined with red taffeta, a gown of black cloth of gold with gold passementerie lined with black taffeta, and other gowns and kirtles. Dowhill Castle is in Fife. It is not clear why Lindsay was looking after these clothes. He was perhaps connected more closely with the Douglas family. The costume appears more splendid than other items mentioned in the treasurer's accounts, which were mostly made by her tailor John Anderson.

The English diplomat Thomas Randolph, who was a friend of her son James, mentioned her illness in April 1562 after James had become unwell, and heard he "takes it of his mother whoe indeade with bothe her systers (of which the Erle of Morton hathe married one, and th'other was wyf unto the Lord Maxwell) are certeyne tymes or the most parte of the yere distempered with an unquiet humour".

She died in 1579.

== Children ==
The children of Margaret Douglas included:

- James Hamilton, 3rd Earl of Arran, who died in 1609.
- David Hamilton, who was a hostage in France for a time
- John Hamilton, 1st Marquess of Hamilton (1540–1604)
- Claud Hamilton, 1st Lord Paisley (1546–1621)
- Anne Hamilton, who married George Gordon, 5th Earl of Huntly
- Jean Hamilton, who was sent to be brought up at the Abbey or Nunnery at Haddington in 1544. She went to France with Mary, Queen of Scots in 1548. She was betrothed to George, Lord Gordon, but he married her sister, Anne. Jean instead married Hugh Montgomerie, 3rd Earl of Eglinton. They divorced in 1562.
- Barbara Hamilton (died 1577), who married (1) Alexander, Lord Gordon, (2) James Fleming, 4th Lord Fleming
