= Mary Stewart, Countess of Buchan =

Scottish princess, daughter of James I of Scotland

- Born: 1434 or 1435; Scotland
- Died: 20 March 1465 (Aged 31); Zeeland
- Burial: Sandenburg, ter Veere, Zeeland
- Spouse: Wolfert VI of Borselen (m. 1444)
- Father: James I of Scotland
- Mother: Joan Beaufort

Mary Stewart, Countess of Buchan (1434 or 1435 – 20 March 1465) was the fifth daughter of James I of Scotland and Joan Beaufort, Queen of Scots. She married Wolfert VI of Borselen, a Zeelander nobleman, and lived in the Netherlands until her death in 1465. She had two children who died young.

== Family ==
Mary had five sisters and twin brothers, one of whom died in infancy. Her surviving brother became James II of Scotland. Her sisters married into various European royal dynasties. Her sister Margaret became the dauphine of France, but died childless at age 20, apparently of fever. Her sister Isabella became the duchess of Brittany and had two daughters. Another sister, Eleanor, married a Habsburg archduke and lived in Austria, but died without any offspring. Her sister Joan, a deaf-mute, stayed in Scotland and married a Scottish earl, leaving four children, and her youngest sister, Annabella, was married twice and divorced twice and had children with her second husband, a Scottish earl.

== Marriage ==
In 1444, Princess Mary married Wolfert VI van Borselen in Veere, Zeeland, Netherlands. He was the son of Hendrick van Borselen, Count of Grandpré and Jean van Halewyn. The marriage stimulated commercial relations between Scotland and the Low Countries and the establishment of the Scottish Staple at Veere.

The Scottish king granted Mary's husband the title of Earl of Buchan, and so Mary became the Countess of Buchan. In 1464, her husband was a Marshal of France, and he was later created Wolfart VI, Lord of Veere and Count of Grandpre.

They had two children, who both died young:

- Charles. died in 1451.
- Jean.

== Death ==
Mary died on 20 March 1465, 30 to 40 years old, without surviving issue. She was buried in Sandenburg, ter Veere, Zeeland.

After her death, her husband married Charlotte de Bourbon, daughter of Louis I, Count of Montpensier. Their daughter Anna married a grandson of Philip the Good. Wolfart died 1487.

The title of Buchan was eventually conferred, in 1469, on her half-brother James Stewart (her mother's son by her second marriage), who was called the 1st Earl of Buchan.

== Ancestry ==
Ancestors of Mary Stewart, Countess of Buchan

16. Walter Stewart, 6th High Steward of Scotland
8. Robert II of Scotland
17. Marjorie Bruce
4. Robert III of Scotland
18. Sir Adam Mure, 1st of Rowallan
9. Elizabeth Mure
19. Janet Mure or Joan Cunningham
2. James I of Scotland
20. Sir Malcolm Drummond, 10th of Lennox
10. Sir John Drummond, 11th of Lennox
21. Amanda Graham
5. Anabella Drummond
22. Sir William de Montifex
11. Mary Montifex
1. Mary Stewart
24. Edward III of England
12. John of Gaunt, 1st Duke of Lancaster
25. Philippa of Hainault
6. John Beaufort, 1st Earl of Somerset
26. Sir Payne de Roet
13. Katherine Swynford
3. Joan Beaufort
28. Thomas Holland, 1st Earl of Kent
14. Thomas Holland, 2nd Earl of Kent
29. Joan, 4th Countess of Kent
7. Margaret Holland
30. Richard FitzAlan, 10th Earl of Arundel
15. Alice FitzAlan
31. Eleanor of Lancaster
