= Joan Beaufort =

Joan Beaufort may refer to:

- Joan Beaufort, Countess of Westmorland (1379–1440), daughter of John of Gaunt and his mistress, Katherine Swynford, later proclaimed legitimate
- Joan Beaufort, Queen of Scots (died 1445), queen consort of James I of Scotland and niece of the above
