= James Douglas, 3rd Earl of Morton =

Scottish nobleman

James Douglas, 3rd Earl of Morton (died 1548) was a Scottish aristocrat.

== Earl of Morton ==
He was a son of John Douglas, 2nd Earl of Morton and a grandson of James Douglas, 1st Earl of Morton and Joan of Scotland, a daughter of James I of Scotland.

He married Catherine Stewart, an illegitimate daughter of King James IV of Scotland by his mistress Marion Boyd. The couple had three daughters; Margaret, Beatrix, and Elizabeth. He was succeeded by his son-in-law, James Douglas, 4th Earl of Morton, husband of his daughter Elizabeth.

His daughter Lady Margaret Douglas married James Hamilton, 2nd Earl of Arran, who was heir presumptive to Mary, Queen of Scots, prior to the birth of her son James in 1566. Beatrix married Robert Maxwell, 6th Lord Maxwell. Morton's three daughters were all affected by mental ill-health.

In 1543, when his son-in-law James Hamilton was Regent of Scotland, Morton lent him money on the security of silver ware, which Regent Arran sent to him at Aberdour Castle.

== Resignation at Brechin ==
In 1541, King James V ordered the Earl to travel to Inverness and enter ward (house-arrest). But the King met him on his way at Brechin on 17 October 1541. Morton resigned his titles to Dalkeith Palace and its lands to the King, and he was allowed to return home. The legal instrument was witnessed by David Beaton, Thomas Erskine of Haltoun, John Tennent, Oliver Sinclair of Pitcairns, Andrew Wood of Largo, and other prominent courtiers. The lands were immediately granted to Robert Douglas of Lochleven, the husband of the King's former mistress Margaret Erskine. Robert Douglas subsequently resigned the title to James V on 20 January 1542, withholding only Aberdour Castle.

In 1543, after the death of James V, the Earl successfully challenged the legality of his resignation before the council of Regent Arran. Morton stated that he was old and infirm and would have been unlikely to survive confinement in Inverness away from the comfort of East Lothian, and was compelled by his 'just dredour' (rightful fear) of the King with his 'menacing' and messages with 'boastful words'. He had 'quietly' had a notary draw up his objections on 29 March 1542. Arran's council declared him a 'constant man' in the face of fear and dread and the transactions were to have no avail in all time to come. Morton was assisted in asserting his rights in 1543 by George Douglas of Pittendreich. The historian, Jamie Cameron, suggests that the motive of James V may have been to settle the Morton heritage on his son by Margaret Erskine, James Stewart, 1st Earl of Moray, in the event the Earldom came to George Douglas's son.

Peerage of Scotland
Preceded by John Douglas	Earl of Morton; 1513–1548	Succeeded by James Douglas
