= John Douglas, 21st Earl of Morton =

John Charles Sholto Douglas, 21st Earl of Morton (19 March 1927 – 5 March 2016) was a Scottish peer and landowner.

Douglas was the son of Hon. Charles William Sholto Douglas and Florence Timson, daughter of Edith Theodosia Glyn and Henry Thomas Timson. He was educated at Bryanston School and Canford School. He succeeded to the earldom in 1976, upon the death of his first cousin, the 20th Earl. Morton was a property consultant, a partner in Dalmahoy Farms and chairman of the Edinburgh Polo Club, and was a director in Scotland of the Bristol & West Building Society. In 1982, he was appointed a deputy lieutenant of West Lothian, and he served as Lord Lieutenant of West Lothian from 1985 to 2002.

He married Mary Sheila Gibbs (1927-2016) in 1949, by whom he had three children:

- Lady Mary Pamela Douglas (b. 1950), married Richard Callander and has issue
- John Stewart Sholto Douglas, 22nd Earl of Morton (b. 1952), married Amanda Kirsten Mitchell and has issue
- Hon. Charles James Sholto Douglas (b. 1954), married Anne Morgan and has issue

Honorary titles
Preceded by The Marquess of Linlithgow	Lord Lieutenant of West Lothian; 1985–2002	Succeeded by Isobel Brydie
Peerage of Scotland
Preceded by Sholto Douglas	Earl of Morton; 1976–2016	Succeeded by John Stewart Sholto Douglas
