= John Douglas, 2nd Earl of Morton =

Earl of Morton (died 1513)

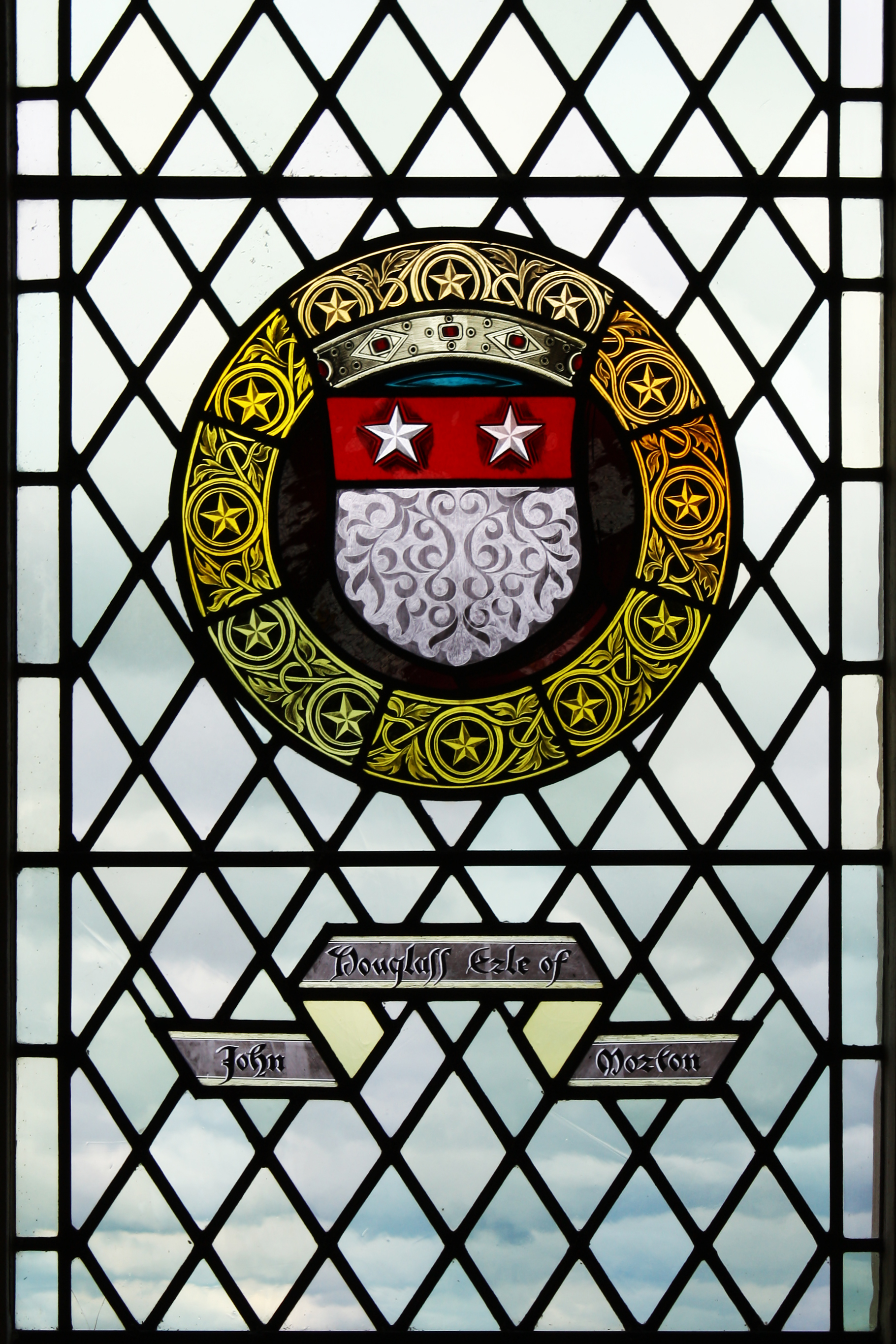
Arms of the first three Earls of Morton

John Douglas, 2nd Earl of Morton died 9 September 1513 at the Battle of Flodden.

== Life ==
He was the son of James Douglas, 1st Earl of Morton and Princess Joan Stewart, Countess of Morton, daughter of James I of Scotland by his wife Lady Joan Beaufort. He became earl in 1493, upon his father's death. He was succeeded by his son James Douglas, 3rd Earl of Morton.

A very wealthy man, John, unlike many of his peers, did not become embroiled in the intrigues and politics of his day. Instead, the shrewd Earl of Morton worked to improve his holdings and was quite the litigator in his time, successfully defending his interests in court. It turned out later that John, as lord of Dalkeith was aware the land had great value both above and below the surface and in fact sat on what was later described as the Great Midlothian Coalfield.

== Marriage and issue ==
He married Janet Crichton, daughter of Patrick Crichton of Cranston-Riddel and had two sons and two daughters:

- James Douglas, 3rd Earl of Morton – died 1548.
- Richard Douglas, referred to in an entail of the Morton estates, had two sons William and James.
- Agnes Douglas, married Alexander Livingston, 5th Lord Livingston.
- Elizabeth Douglas, married her second cousin Robert Keith, Master of Marischal. Their son William became the 4th Earl Marischal.

== Notes ==
Peerage of Scotland
Preceded by James Douglas	Earl of Morton; 1493–1513	Succeeded by James Douglas
