= Earl of Morton =

Scottish peerage title

Earldom of Morton
- Arms of Douglas, Earls of Morton:Quarterly, 1st and 4th, Argent a man's heart Gules ensigned of an imperial crown proper, on a chief Azure three mullets of the first (for Douglas); 2nd and 3rd, Argent three piles issuing from the chief Gules, and in chief two mullets of the field (Douglas of Dalkieth and Lochleven).
- Creation date: 1548
- Created by: Mary, Queen of Scots
- Peerage: Peerage of Scotland
- First holder: James Douglas, 1st Earl of Morton
- Present holder: Stewart Douglas, 22nd Earl of Morton
- Heir apparent: John Douglas, Lord Aberdour
- Subsidiary titles: Lord Aberdour
- Seat: Dalmahoy Farms
- Former seats: Aberdour Castle; Dalmahoy; Conaglen House
- Motto: Lock sicker (be sure)

The title Earl of Morton was created in the Peerage of Scotland in 1458 for James Douglas of Dalkeith. Along with it, the title Lord Aberdour was granted. This latter title is the courtesy title for the eldest son and heir to the Earl of Morton.

The family seat is Dalmahoy Farms, Morton near Kirknewton, West Lothian.

== History ==
=== Douglases of Dalkeith ===
The Douglases of Dalkeith are descended from Andrew Douglas of Hermiston (or Herdmanston) (d.b. 1277), younger son of Archibald I, Lord of Douglas (fl. c. 1198–1238). He was succeeded by his son William Douglas of Hermiston, a signatory of the Ragman Roll in 1296. William of Hermiston's son, James Douglas of Lothian succeeded his father and produced two sons, Sir William Douglas and Sir John Douglas. Sir William Douglas, known as the Knight of Liddesdale or the Flower of Chivalry obtained the privileges of the barony of Dalkeith, in Midlothian, in 1341, and the barony of Aberdour, in Fife, in 1342. Following his murder at the hands of his godson William Douglas, 1st Earl of Douglas, both baronies passed to his nephew, James Douglas, 1st Lord Dalkeith. James Douglas was confirmed in this position when his title was ratified by the Earl of Douglas prior to 1370. The lands of Dalkeith, and Aberdour, in Fife, were combined as a single barony in 1386, with the principal seat at Dalkeith Castle, and a secondary residence at Aberdour Castle. James was the brother of Nicholas Douglas, 1st Lord of Mains.

=== Earldom of Morton ===
The 4th Lord Dalkeith succeeded to his estates upon the resignation of his father c. 1457 and in 1458 was raised to the peerage as Earl of Morton, prior to his marriage to Joanna, the mute deaf daughter of King James I. Lord Dalkeith was then a subsidiary title held by the Earls of Morton, and used as a courtesy title for the eldest son and heir, until the title and estates of Dalkeith were sold to the Earl of Buccleuch by the 7th Earl in 1642. When in 1458, James Douglas, lord Dalkeith, was to receive the name 'Morton' for his intended earldom, a protest was presented against this creation, asserting correctly that the lands of Mortoun belonged heritably to his step-grandmother, Janet Borthwick, widow of Sir James Douglas, known as 1st Lord of Dalkeith, and to her son William Douglas (progenitor of the Whittingehame branch of the Douglases), to which the Chancellor answered that "Lord Dalkeith was not to receive his title in the Earldom for the lands of Mortoun lying in the Lordship of Niddisdale but for the lands of Mortoun in the territory of Caldercleir".

In 1538, James V summoned the 3rd Earl before the Privy Council for non-payment of his feudal dues, and in 1540 the Earl was banished to Inverness. Morton reached Brechin, in Angus, where he signed a deed resigning his lands to his kinsman Robert Douglas of Lochleven, who was then compelled to resign the lands in turn to James V. After James V's death in late 1542, George Douglas of Pittendreich and the Earl of Arran assisted Morton in reclaiming his lands, including Aberdour. In return their sons were to marry two of Morton's three daughters. Pittendreich's son James (1525–1581) married the heiress, Elizabeth, and succeeded to the earldom in 1553.

The 4th Earl of Morton became Regent of Scotland in 1572, for the infant James VI and I. However, once James VI reached the age of majority, the 4th Earl was implicated in the murder of James' father, Lord Darnley in 1567, and was executed in 1581. The earldom was forfeited between 1581 and 1586, although the nephew-in-law of the 4th earl (also grandson of the 3rd earl), John Maxwell, 8th Lord Maxwell (1552–1593) was created Earl of Morton in 1581, and continued to use the title until his death. Although Archibald Douglas, 8th Earl of Angus (1555–1588) was confirmed as 5th Earl of Morton in 1586, Lord Maxwell's title of Morton, which had been revoked in 1585, was revived in 1587 and 1592. As a result, two families were in possession of the Earldom, and a conflict arose. This continued into the time of the 7th Earl of Morton (1582–1648), when John Maxwell, 9th Lord Maxwell (c. 1586–1613), also claimed the earldom. Lord Maxwell, however, was forfeited in 1609 and his rights then failed, his titles and estates being restored in 1618 to his brother Robert, with the title of Earl of Nithsdale (1620) in lieu of Morton.

== Lords of Dalkeith (1341) ==
- William Douglas, Lord of Liddesdale
- James Douglas, 1st Lord Dalkeith
- James Douglas, 2nd Lord Dalkeith
- James Douglas, 3rd Lord Dalkeith
- James Douglas, 4th Lord Dalkeith (created Earl of Morton 1458)

== Earls of Morton (1458) ==
- James Douglas, 1st Earl of Morton (d. 1493)
- John Douglas, 2nd Earl of Morton (d. 1513)
- James Douglas, 3rd Earl of Morton (d. 1548) ("abeyant" 1548)
- James Douglas, 4th Earl of Morton (c. 1516–1581) (abeyance terminated 1550, forfeited 1580/81)
- John Maxwell, 8th Lord Maxwell (1552–1593), a grandson of the 3rd Earl, succeeded briefly as Earl of Morton.
- Archibald Douglas, 5th Earl of Morton (c. 1555–1588), also 8th Earl of Angus (forfeiture reversed 1586)
- William Douglas, 6th Earl of Morton (1540–1606)
- William Douglas, 7th Earl of Morton (1582–1648)
- Robert Douglas, 8th Earl of Morton (d. 1649)
- William Douglas, 9th Earl of Morton (d. 1681)
- James Douglas, 10th Earl of Morton (d. 1686)
- James Douglas, 11th Earl of Morton (d. 1715)
- Robert Douglas, 12th Earl of Morton (d. 1730)
- George Douglas, 13th Earl of Morton (1662–1738)
- James Douglas, 14th Earl of Morton (c. 1703–1768)
- Sholto Charles Douglas, 15th Earl of Morton (1732–1774)
- George Douglas, 16th Earl of Morton (1761–1827)
- George Sholto Douglas, 17th Earl of Morton (1789–1858)
- Sholto John Douglas, 18th Earl of Morton (1818–1884)
- Sholto George Douglas, 19th Earl of Morton (1844–1935)
- Sholto Charles John Hay Douglas, 20th Earl of Morton (1907–1976)
- John Charles Sholto Douglas, 21st Earl of Morton (1927–2016)
- John Stewart Sholto Douglas, 22nd Earl of Morton (b. 1952)

== Present peer ==
John Stewart Sholto Douglas, 22nd Earl of Morton (born 1952) is a Scottish peer and landowner.

Known as Stewart Morton, Douglas is the son of John Douglas, 21st Earl of Morton, and his wife Mary Sheila Gibbs. He succeeded to the earldom in 2016, upon the death of his father.

He married Amanda Kirsten Mitchell, daughter of David John Macfarlane Mitchell, and they have three children:

- John David Sholto Douglas, Lord Aberdour (born 1986), the heir apparent
- Lady Katherine Florence Douglas (born 1989), Olympic rower

Peerage of Scotland
Preceded by John Douglas	Earl of Morton; 2016–present	Incumbent

== Seats ==
Historical residences of the Earl of Morton include:

- Aberdour Castle, Fife
- Aberdour House, Fife
- Dalkeith House, Midlothian
- Dalmahoy House, Edinburgh
- Loch Leven Castle, Kinross
- Morton Castle, Dumfries and Galloway

== See also ==
- Baron Penrhyn, a title created, in 1866, for the younger brother of the 17th Earl.
- Clan Douglas
