= Joan Beaufort, Queen of Scots =

Queen of Scots from 1424 to 1437

Joan Beaufort
- Portrait in the Forman Armorial, 1562

Queen consort of Scots
- Tenure: 12 February 1424 – 21 February 1437
- Coronation: 21 May 1424

Queen regent of Scotland
- Regency: 1437 – 1439
- Monarch: James II
- Born: c. 1404; The Palace of Westminster, England
- Died: 15 July 1445 (aged 40–41); Dunbar Castle, East Lothian, Scotland
- Burial: Perth Charterhouse, Scotland
- Spouse: James I of Scotland (m. 1424; died 1437); James Stewart, the Black Knight of Lorne (m. 1439)
- Issue Detail: Margaret, Dauphine of France; Isabella, Duchess of Brittany; Eleanor, Archduchess of Austria; Mary, Countess of Buchan; Joan, Countess of Morton; Alexander, Duke of Rothesay; James II, King of Scotland; Annabella, Countess of Huntly; John, 1st Earl of Atholl; James, 1st Earl of Buchan; Andrew, Bishop of Moray
- House: Beaufort
- Father: John Beaufort, 1st Earl of Somerset
- Mother: Margaret Holland

Joan Beaufort (c. 1404 – 15 July 1445) was Queen of Scots from 1424 to 1437 as the wife of King James I.

== Background and early life ==
Joan Beaufort was a daughter of John Beaufort, 1st Earl of Somerset, a legitimised son of John of Gaunt by his mistress (and later third wife) Katherine Swynford. She was born in 1404. Joan's mother was Margaret Holland, the granddaughter of Joan of Kent (wife of Edward the Black Prince) from her earlier marriage to Thomas Holland, 1st Earl of Kent. Joan was also a half-niece of King Henry IV of England, first cousin once removed of Richard II, and great-granddaughter of Edward III. Her uncle, Henry Beaufort, was a cardinal and Chancellor of England.

King James I of Scotland met Joan during his time as a prisoner in England, and knew her from at least 1420. She is said to have been the inspiration for King James's famous allegorical romantic poem, The Kingis Quair, written during his captivity, after he saw her from his window in the garden. The poem described her as 'beautee eneuch to mak a world to dote.'

The marriage was at least partially political, as their marriage was part of the agreement for his release from captivity under the Treaty of London (4 December 1423). From an English perspective an alliance with the Beauforts was meant to establish Scotland's alliance with the English, rather than the French. Negotiations resulted in Joan's dowry of 10,000 marks being subtracted from James's substantial ransom.

== Queen of Scotland ==
Arms of Joan as queen consort of Scotland

On 12 February 1424, Joan Beaufort and King James were wed at St Mary Overie Church in Southwark. They were feasted at Winchester Palace that year by her uncle, Cardinal Henry Beaufort. She accompanied her husband on his return from captivity in England to Scotland, and was crowned alongside him at Scone Abbey.

Joan was assigned lands in Scotland, including some in Perthshire, and she may have been influential in James's foundation of a Carthusian monastery in Perth in 1426. In 1428, James made magnates and bishops swear on oath of allegiance to Joan on succeeding to their lands and titles. In the same year she took part in negotiations for their eldest daughter's marriage to the French dauphin and undertook a royal progress to Inverness. From 1431, Joan received an annuity of £360 from the king and in 1435 he ordered the estates to give letters of fidelity to his queen.

As queen, Joan often pleaded with the king for those who might be executed. In 1429, Alexander Macdonald, Lord of the Isles, was captured after burning and pillaging in the Highlands and she pleaded for him to be pardoned. In 1431 she interceded again to secure pardons for the Lord of the Isles and Archibald Douglas, 5th Earl of Douglas, who had been imprisoned in Lochleven Castle.

The royal couple had eight children, including the future James II, and Margaret of Scotland, future spouse of Louis XI of France. She also remained in contact with her English family, with her brothers and uncles visiting Joan and her husband ahead of formal embassies.

== Regency ==
James I was assassinated in the Dominican Friary in Perth on 21 February 1437. Joan had also been a target of assassination along with her husband and was wounded, but survived her injuries. She put her husband's mutilated body on display, and her letters to her family played an important role in spreading news and details of his murder in England and throughout Europe.

Joan successfully directed her husband's supporters to attack his assassin Walter Stewart, Earl of Atholl, but was forced to give up power three months later. The prospect of being ruled by an English woman was unpopular in Scotland. The Earl of Douglas was thus appointed to power, though Joan remained in charge of her son and represented his interests.

== Later life ==
In July 1439, she married James Stewart, the Black Knight of Lorne, after obtaining a papal dispensation for both consanguinity and affinity. After the marriage she was styled Queen Dowager Joan of Scotland. She was the second Scottish queen mother to remarry.

James was an ally of the young William Douglas, 6th Earl of Douglas, and plotted with him to overthrow Alexander Livingston, governor of Stirling Castle, during the minority of James II. Livingston arrested Joan on 3 August 1439 and forced her to relinquish custody of the young king until his majority. She was released on 31 August 1439. Joan died in 1445 at Dunbar Castle and was buried beside her first husband in the Carthusian Priory at Perth.

== Issue ==
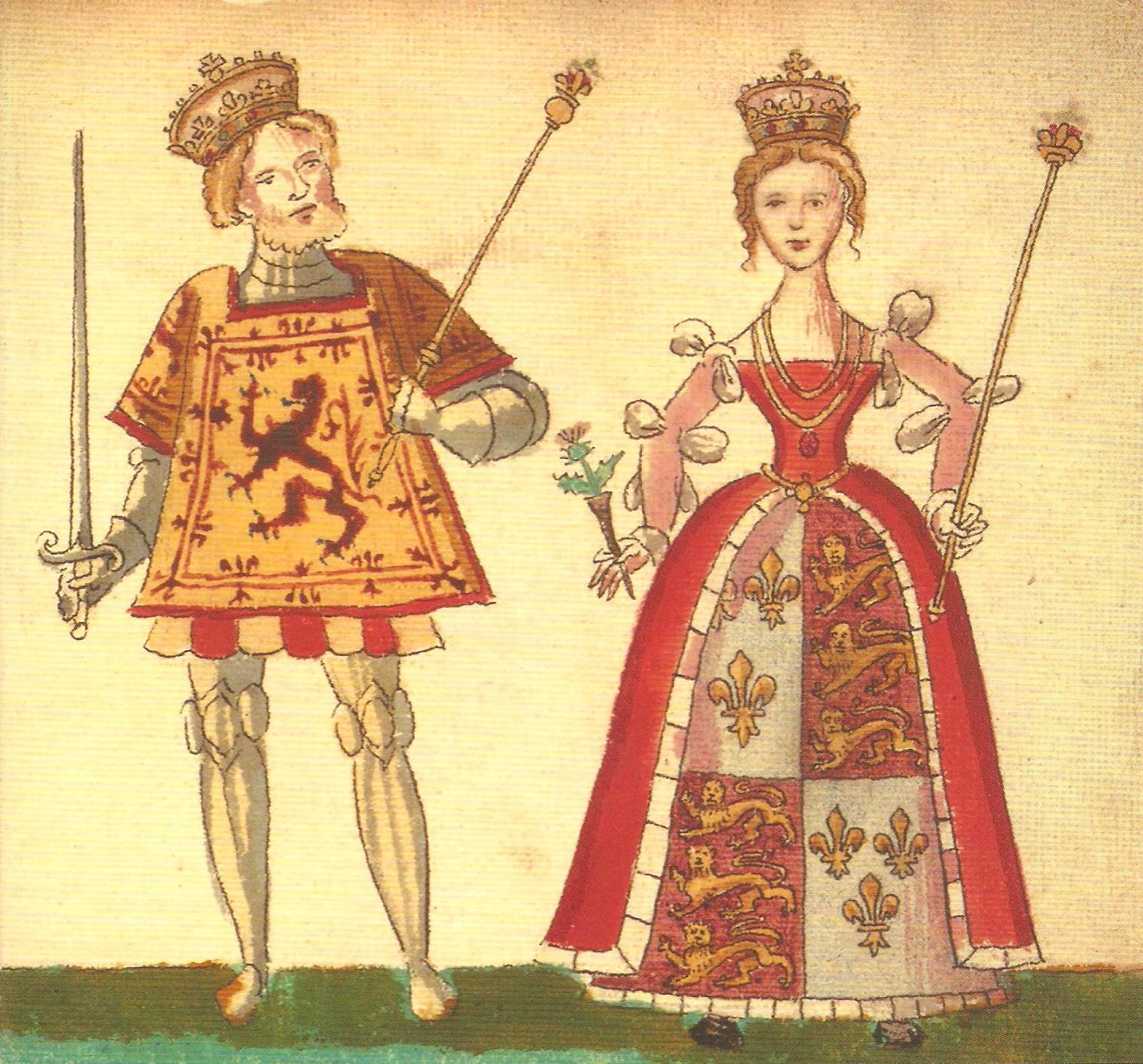
16th-century manuscript illustration showing James I of Scotland and Queen Joan Beaufort, from the National Library of Scotland, Edinburgh

With James I of Scotland Joan had six daughters and two sons:

- Margaret Stewart, Princess of Scotland (1424–1445) married Dauphin Louis later King Louis XI of France.
- Isabella Stewart, Princess of Scotland (1426–1494) married Francis I, Duke of Brittany.
- Mary Stewart, Countess of Buchan (c. 1428 – 1465) married Wolfart VI van Borsselen in 1444.
- Joan of Scotland, Countess of Morton (c. 1428–1486) married James Douglas, 1st Earl of Morton.
- Alexander Stewart, Duke of Rothesay (born and died 1430); twin of James II.
- King James II of Scotland (1430–1460) married Mary of Guelders on 3 July 1449.
- Eleanor Stewart, Princess of Scotland (1433–1484) married Sigismund, Archduke of Austria.
- Annabella Stewart, Princess of Scotland (c. 1436 – 1509) married and divorced, firstly, Louis of Savoy, and then married and divorced, secondly, George Gordon, 2nd Earl of Huntly.

With James Stewart, the Black Knight of Lorne:

- John Stewart, 1st Earl of Atholl (c. 1440 – 1512), married, firstly, Margaret Douglas, Fair Maid of Galloway, and, secondly, Eleanor Sinclair.
- James Stewart, 1st Earl of Buchan (1442–1499), married Margaret Ogilvy.
- Andrew Stewart, Bishop of Moray from 1483–1501 (c. 1443 – 1501).

== Ancestry ==
Ancestors of Joan Beaufort, Queen of Scots

8. Edward III of England
4. John of Gaunt, 1st Duke of Lancaster
9. Philippa of Hainault
2. John Beaufort, 1st Earl of Somerset
10. Payne de Roet
5. Katherine Swynford
1. Joan Beaufort, Queen of Scotland
12. Thomas Holland, 1st Earl of Kent
6. Thomas Holland, 2nd Earl of Kent
13. Joan of Kent
3. Margaret Holland
14. Richard Fitzalan, 10th Earl of Arundel
7. Alice Fitzalan
15. Eleanor of Lancaster

== Notes ==
Scottish royalty
Vacant Title last held by Anabella Drummond	Queen consort of Scotland; 1424–1437	Vacant Title next held by Mary of Guelders
