= James Douglas, 1st Earl of Morton =

Scottish earl (1426–1493)

James Douglas
- 1st Earl of Morton

4th Lord of Dalkeith
- Reign: 1456 – 22 October 1493
- Predecessor: James Douglas, 2nd Lord of Dalkeith
- Successor: John Douglas, 2nd Earl of Morton
- Born: 1426
- Died: 22 October 1493 (aged 66–67)
- Noble family: Douglas
- Spouse: Joan Stewart, Countess of Morton
- Issue: John Douglas, 2nd Earl of Morton; James; Janet, Countess of Bothwell; Elizabeth
- Father: James Douglas, 2nd Lord of Dalkeith
- Mother: Elizabeth Gifford

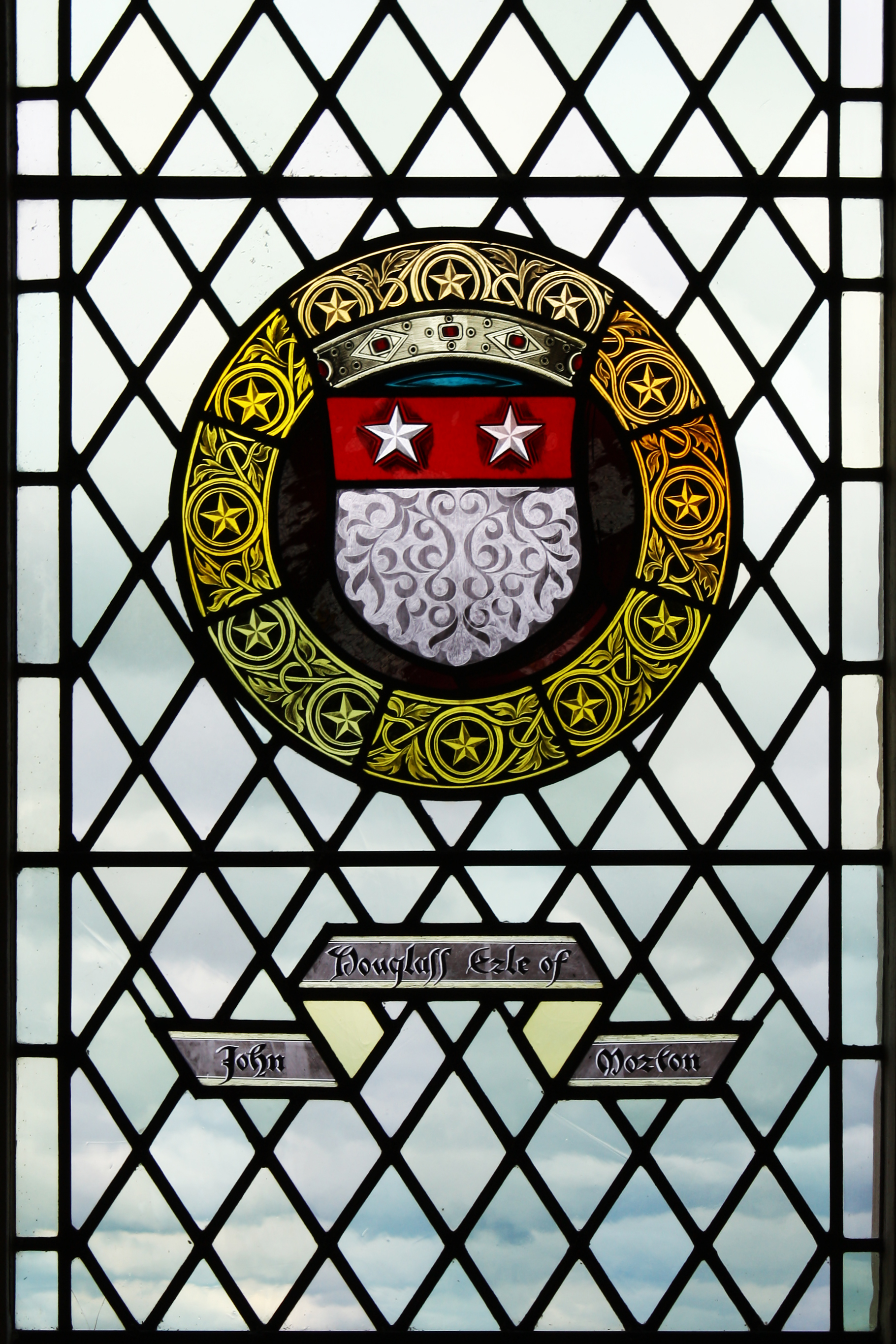
Arms of the first three Earls of Morton

James Douglas (1426 – 22 October 1493), the 4th Lord of Dalkeith, was created the 1st Earl of Morton in 1458.

== Life ==
He was the son of James Douglas, 2nd Lord of Dalkeith and Elizabeth Gifford, daughter of James Gifford of Sheriffhall. His father resigned all his estates to James in 1456 when James became the 4th Lord of Dalkeith. James was created Earl of Morton in 1458 (Note: The name of this earldom derives from a small holding in East Calder. Originally it was named for another family holding, the Parish of Morton in Nithsdale but at the time of his belting as Earl, his step-grandmother, Janet Borthwick, who held Morton in Nithsdale objected to the name of the Earldom but it was at that time determined the name came from Morton in East Calder (Calderclere). See Scots Peerage, Vol. 6, p. 354.) upon his marriage to Joan Stewart (Note: "According to modern usage this lady would be entitled princess, but the sons and daughters of the Kings of Scotland were seldom given that style of courtesy until after the union of the Crowns." Maxwell, History of Douglas, Vol. 1 (1902), p. 239 n. 2.) (1428-1493), the daughter of James I, King of Scots. She was a deaf-mute.

The Earl entered into a marriage contract with Patrick Graham, Bishop of St. Andrews between the Bishop's niece and John Douglas, the Earl's eldest son and heir. In turn the Grahams, the Bishop, his brother and nephew, allied themselves to the Earl and pledged to assist him in recovering the diverted lands of Whittingehame and Morton. It appears, however, that this pledge was intended to draw the Earl of Morton into a conspiracy that included the Bishop, Lord Boyd and his party. Robert Boyd, 1st Lord Boyd who, as one of the Regents during the minority of James III of Scotland, took possession of the young king and married his son to the king's elder sister, for which crimes he was later attainted for high treason. The Earl of Morton apparently did not participate since he sat on the jury which convicted the Boyds. Bishop Graham was later excommunicated and deposed.

The lands of Whittinghame and all rights over the barony of Morton, Dumfriesshire were resigned into the Earl's hands in 1473-4 and in that same year he recovered the lordship of Dalkeith increasing the Earls already vast estates. He re-endowed the collegiate church at Dalkeith his 3rd great-grandfather founded and he also founded St. Martha's Hospital in Aberdour in 1474. The Earl died on 22 October 1493 when his son John succeeded him as the 2nd Earl of Morton. His wife Joan predeceased him by 4 months dying on 22 June 1493.

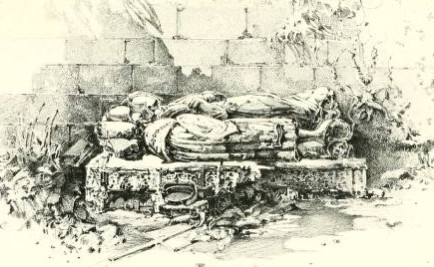
The tombs of Lord and Lady Morton as they appeared in 1902. Note the blank faces and missing hands.

== The Morton Monument ==
The Earl and Countess of Morton were buried together in the choir of the parish church of St. Nicholas Buccleuch, known as the Dalkeith Collegiate Church, in Dalkeith, south of Fife and east of Edinburgh, in Midlothian, Scotland. Known as the Morton Monument, their tombs are covered with their stone effigies, complete with their armorial bearings. (Note: Their arms, which identify their tomb, show his as two mullets in chief instead of the three of the Douglas of Douglas arms while hers shows the Douglas of Morton as just described impaled with the royal arms of Scotland. See: Maxwell, House of Douglas, Vol. 1, p. 240.) The choir is now in the ruins, leaving the tombs out in the open, where, in a few centuries, the elements have erased their faces. Their hands, pressed together in prayer, were likely to have been destroyed during the Reformation. Today, as one of the visitors remarked, "[o]nce crisply carved and detailed with heraldic devices", the tombs have "the look of sand sculptures after the tide has washed in and retreated". Due to their historical value, in 2005 a team of volunteers and preservationists created a protective canopy over their effigies.

== Family ==
He and his wife Princess Joan were the parents of:

- Sir John Douglas, 2nd Earl of Morton.
- James, appeared in several writs 1466–1480.
- Janet, married bef. 1 February 1490–1 to Sir Patrick Hepburn, 1st Earl of Bothwell.
- Elizabeth, she was mentioned in a charter of 1479.

== Notes ==
Peerage of Scotland
New creation	Earl of Morton; 1458–1493	Succeeded by John Douglas
