= Joan Stewart, Countess of Morton =

Daughter of King James I of Scotland

Joan Stewart
- Countess of Morton
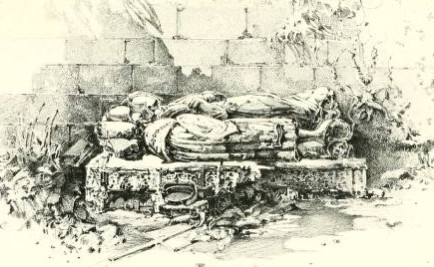
- The tombs of Lord and Lady Morton as they appeared in 1902. Note the blank faces and missing hands.
- Born: c. 1428
- Died: 22 June 1493 (Aged 65)
- Burial: Dalkeith Collegiate Church
- Spouse: James Douglas, 1st Earl of Morton
- Issue more...: John Douglas, 2nd Earl of Morton
- House: Stewart
- Father: James I of Scotland
- Mother: Joan Beaufort

Princess Joan Stewart, Countess of Morton, (Note: "According to modern usage this lady would be titled princess, but the sons and daughters of the Kings of Scotland were seldom given that style of courtesy until after the union of the Crowns." Maxwell, House of Douglas, Vol. 1, p. 239, note 2.) also called Joanna (c. 1428 – 22 June 1493), was the daughter of James I, King of Scotland, and the wife of James Douglas, 1st Earl of Morton. She was known, in Latin, as the muta domina [mute lady] of Dalkeith.

== Life ==
Born in Scotland c. 1428, (Note: It is not known exactly when and where was Joan born, but Maxwell believed that she "must have been of at least marriageable age at the time of her nuptials, because, 18 years before, she had been betrothed to James Douglas, 2nd Earl of Angus ... " See: Maxwell, House of Douglas, Vol. 1, p. 238, note 1. In the 1440s, it was common for noble daughters to be married at 13, 14 or 15. (See: Elizabeth Ewen, 'The Early Modern Family' in T[homas]. M[artin]. Devine and Jenny Wormald, eds., The Oxford Handbook of Modern Scottish History (Oxford: Oxford University Press, 2012), p. 271 ISBN 0199563691). Marriages could be arranged even when children were still in their cradles. The actual marriage required consent which could be given as early as age 7, but could also be voided until the girl was 12 and the boy 14. See: Eileen Power, Maxine Berg, Medieval Women (Cambridge University Press, 2012), pp. 31–32 ISBN 1107650151) she was the third daughter of James I of Scotland and Joan Beaufort. Joan had two younger brothers, including the future king of Scotland, James II, and five sisters. She had "the misfortune to be deaf and dumb", and was known as muta domina or "the mute lady". Joan was reported to have used sign language to communicate, even in public (although it was considered at that time to be impolite).

Joan was contracted to marry her cousin, James Douglas, 3rd Earl of Angus, on 18 October 1440 when she was 13 years old, but he died (without issue) in 1446 before the marriage could take place.

In 1445 Joan was sent to France and did not return home to Scotland until 1457. (Note: Maxwell dates her return to "the spring of 1458". See: Maxwell, House of Douglas, Vol. 1, p. 238.) She had been promised in marriage to the Dauphin of France but the marriage did not take place, probably due to her inability to articulate. (Note: This Dauphin of France was the future king of France, Louis XI. At that time, he was the widower of Joan's older sister Margaret, who died childless on 16 August 1444. See: Scots Peerage, Vol. I, p. 19.)

Joan married another James Douglas, the 4th Baron Dalkeith, before 15 May 1459, who at the time of their marriage was raised to the peerage as the first Earl of Morton. They were granted a dispensation on 7 January 1463/4 for being consanguineous in the second and third degrees. Joan and her husband James were both aware of their close relationships but were persuaded to marry by her brother King James II of Scotland and applied for the dispensation to legitimize their marriage. (Note: While the marriage between Joan and James was legitimized by papal dispensation, in 1562 Hugh Montgomerie, 3rd Earl of Eglinton, divorced his countess, Joanna Hamilton, on grounds of consanguinity, Joan Stewart, the muta domina, being their common ancestress. See: Notes and Queries, Tenth Series, Vol. II (July–December 1904), p. 56.) Countess Joan died in 1493, predeceasing her husband, James, by four months. They had four children.

== Children ==
Together Joan and her husband James had four children:

- Sir John Douglas, 2nd Earl of Morton (bef. 1466 – 1513), married to Janet Crichton, daughter of Patrick Crichton of Cranston-Riddel. He was killed at the Battle of Flodden.
- James, (d. aft. 1480) appeared in several writs 1466–1480.
- Janet, married bef. 1 February 1480–81 to Sir Patrick Hepburn, 1st Earl of Bothwell.
- Elizabeth, mentioned in a charter of 1479 after which nothing further is known of her.

== The Morton Monument ==
The Earl and Countess of Morton were buried together in the choir of the parish church of St. Nicholas Buccleuch, known as the Dalkeith Collegiate Church, in Dalkeith, south of Fife and east of Edinburgh, in Midlothian, Scotland. Known as the Morton Monument, their tombs are covered with their stone effigies, complete with their armorial bearings. (Note: Their arms, which identify their tomb, show his as two mullets in chief instead of the three of the Douglas of Douglas arms while hers shows the Douglas of Morton as just described impaled with the royal arms of Scotland. See: Maxwell, House of Douglas, Vol. 1, p. 240.) This is believed to be the world's oldest image of a known deaf person. The choir is now in the ruins, leaving the tombs out in the open, where, in a few centuries, the elements have erased their faces. Their hands, pressed together in prayer, were likely to have been destroyed during the Reformation. Today, as one of the visitors remarked, "[o]nce crisply carved and detailed with heraldic devices", the tombs have "the look of sand sculptures after the tide has washed in and retreated". Due to their historical value, in 2005 a team of volunteers and preservationists created a protective canopy over their effigies.

== Ancestry ==
Ancestors of Joan Stewart, Countess of Morton

8. Robert II of Scotland
4. Robert III of Scotland
9. Elizabeth Mure
2. James I of Scotland
10. Sir John Drummond, 11th of Lennox
5. Anabella Drummond
11. Mary Montifex
1. Joan Stewart
12. John of Gaunt, 1st Duke of Lancaster
6. John Beaufort, 1st Earl of Somerset
13. Katherine Swynford
3. Joan Beaufort
14. Thomas Holland, 2nd Earl of Kent
7. Margaret Holland
15. Alice FitzAlan
