= Brunstane Castle =

Castle in Scotland

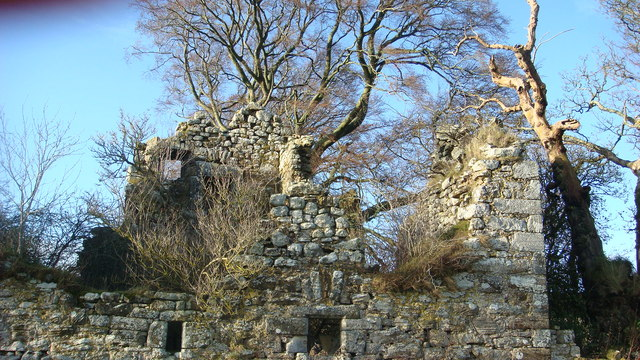

Location
- Location within Midlothian
- Coordinates: 55.8106°N 3.2755°W

Site history
- Built: 16th century

Brunstane Castle (alternatively Brunston, Brunstain or Brunstone Castle) is a ruined tower house, dating from the 16th century, around 2 miles (3.2 km) south-west of Penicuik, on the north bank of the North Esk, in Midlothian, Scotland.

== History ==
The castle was originally a property of the Crichtons. A charter of the lands of Brunston granted by James IV in 1493 to Edward Crichton and his wife Agnes Cockburn specified a feudal rent of a red rose on the feast day of St John the Baptist.

In 1546, the Protestant reformer George Wishart stayed at Brunstane with Alexander Crichton and was arrested soon after at the house of John Cockburn of Ormiston. Wishart was taken to St Andrews, where he was martyred.

Crichton and Cockburn and other Lothian Lairds sided with England during the war now known as the Rough Wooing. Regent Arran brought four cannon from Edinburgh Castle at the end of February and captured their houses. The lairds of Brunstane and Ormiston were declared traitors and the Privy Council ordered the demolition of Brunstane, Gilberstoun, and Ormiston. In March 1548, slaters were employed to take the roof off the House of Brunstane, and the roof timbers were dismantled and taken to Edinburgh Castle. The woods at Brunstane were harvested and the workmen were protected by 10 gunners armed with culverins. Timber and stone from Brunstane Castle was used in the construction of the new Spur fortification at Edinburgh Castle designed by Migliorino Ubaldini.

On 6 April 1548, the English commander Grey of Wilton reported that Alexander Crichton's house had not been burnt, but, "Marry! the topp is pulled downe, so much of the stone as was lyked, which laye in redyness to bylde, caryed to Edynborough, his yong trees cut up, and all worse handled than if it had been with fyer."

The house and gardens were reconstructed in the later 16th-century. John Preston of Penicuik, Lord Fentonbarns, acquired the castle by 1613. There are remains of a designed landscape to the west of the castle, possibly laid out by James Preston or his son. The design includes four quadrangular islands now set in a marshy area. This would have been a decorative home for fish and waterfowl and visible from the tower house.

In 1632 John Maitland, 1st Earl of Lauderdale, acquired the Crichton family property nearer Portobello, called Gilbertstoun and also called "Brunstane", which he extended.

== Structure ==
The castle, which has two stories and a garret, has a square stair tower. The stair tower has a corbelled-out cap-house. Under the windows there are gun-loops. There is a large fireplace in the kitchen, which is in the basement. The Hall was on the first floor. Over the doorway is an armorial panel. There are still remains of the courtyard, with a square tower dated 1568. The courtyard has a round-arched postern in the east wall.

The building is a Scheduled Ancient Monument.
