= Ninian Cockburn =

Scottish soldier

Ninian Cockburn (died 6 May 1579) was a Scottish soldier and officer of the Garde Écossaise, a company which guarded the French king. He had an ambiguous role in political relations between Scotland, France and England during the war of the Rough Wooing and the Scottish Reformation.

== Family and early career ==
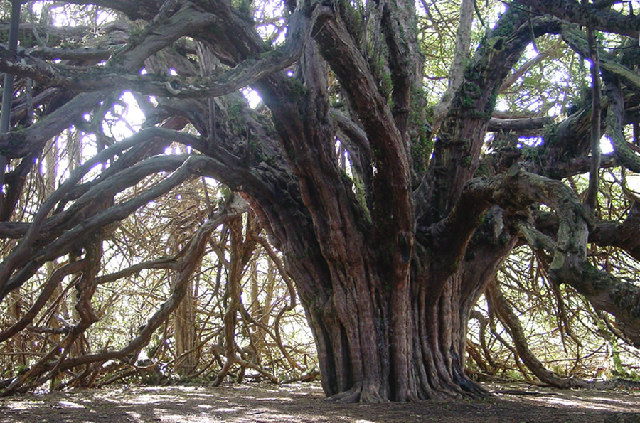
Ancient yew tree at the site of Ormiston House

Ninian Cockburn is said to have been the third son of William Cockburn of Ormiston, East Lothian and Janet Somerville. However, evidence of his exact relationship to the Ormiston family is elusive. In Scotland the name Ninian was used interchangeably with "Ringan". The Cockburn family had strong Protestant leanings; John Knox was the tutor of his nephew, and George Wishart was arrested at Ormiston.

Ninian married Elizabeth Kemp. Mary, Queen of Scots gave her a termly pension of £75. She was a connection of Janet Sinclair, the nurse of Mary Queen of Scots, and Henry Kemp, who had been pursemaster to James V of Scotland. Ninian was paid for travelling in connection with the King's privy purse in 1540. Ninian may also have been Alexander Crichton of Brunstane's servant "Cockburn." Brunstane worked for Cardinal Beaton at this time. Brunstane's servant was sent to France by James V in March 1540 with royal insignia borrowed from the King's pursuivant Patrick Ogilvy.

== Rough Wooing ==
=== Murder of Cardinal Beaton ===
Ninian was among those accused of the murder of Cardinal David Beaton in 1546, and he joined the Protestant garrison during the subsequent siege of St Andrews Castle. For this, Ninian was summoned for treason on 10 June 1546. Ninian's older brother, John Cockburn of Ormiston was also accused of involvement in the Cardinal's murder. John Cockburn was a prominent Protestant and on good terms with England. He had a licence to trade in England during the war of the Rough Wooing. According to the Earl of Glencairn, Ninian Cockburn was a double agent, a spy at St Andrews Castle for the Governor of Scotland, Regent Arran.

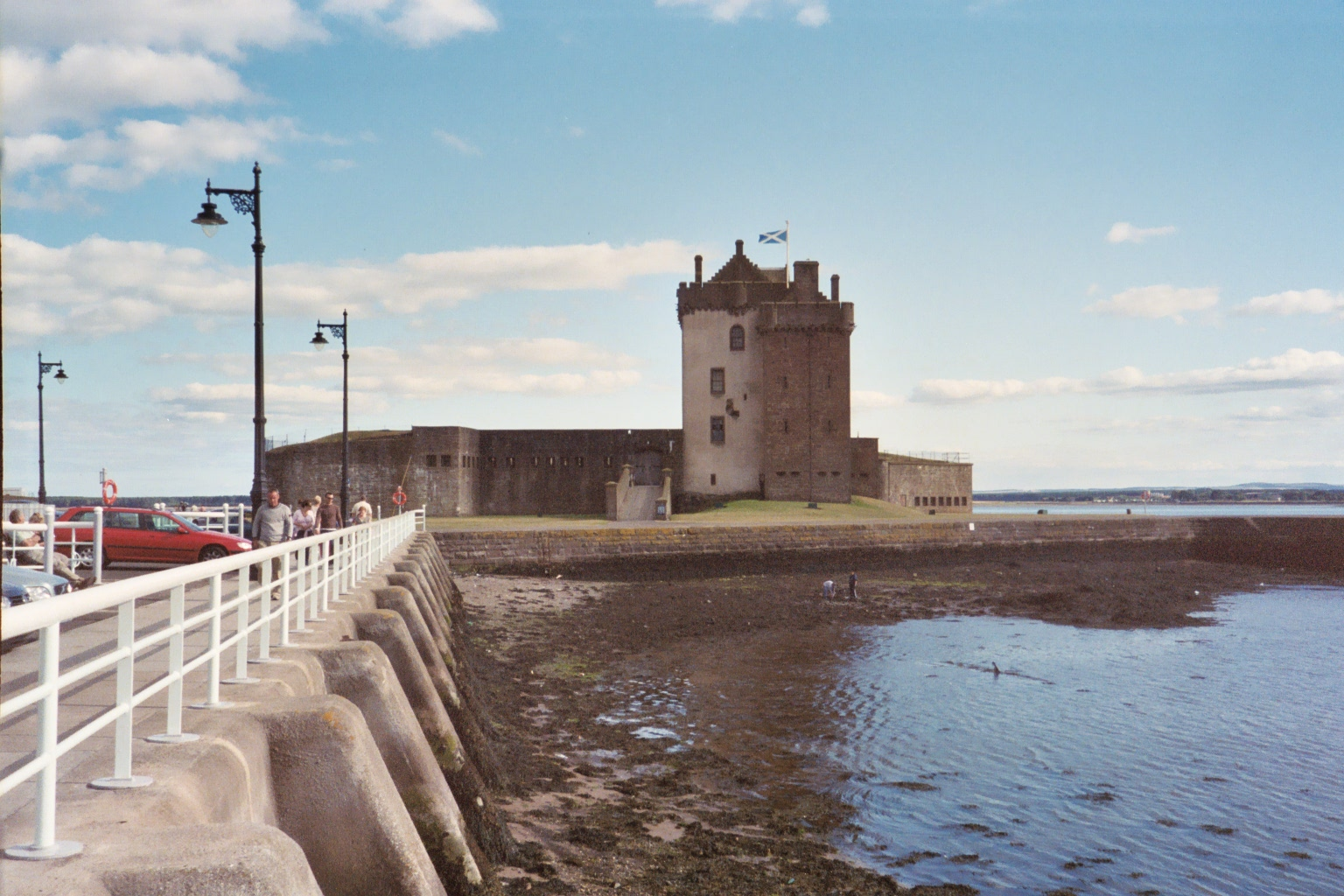
Ninian Cockburn helped Andrew Dudley install an English garrison in Broughty Castle for a £4 reward

=== Assured Scot ===
After the battle of Pinkie in September 1547, Ninian Cockburn was involved in the handover of Broughty Castle to the English. Ralph Sadler who was treasurer of the English army gave him a reward of £4. In October 1547, Ninian was a spy for Grey of Wilton and liaised with the English captain of Broughty, Andrew Dudley and the captain of Inchcolm, John Luttrell. He was trying to build support for an English Protestant takeover of Scotland and collected names of potential supporters. In his report, Ninian lamented that these supporters were motivated for gain from England rather than by the "Word of God." Andrew Dudley hoped to distribute English bibles in Dundee from his base at Broughty.

His brother John Cockburn was declared a traitor on 29 February 1548. Regent Arran had captured the House of Ormiston and the Privy Council ordered its demolition. Ninian wrote to Protector Somerset on 16 March, repeating some older news from a letter of 20 February which does not survive. He had been to Mary of Guise with a message from Somerset but her answer was not satisfactory, and she had managed to make him the enemy of Regent Arran, his half-brother John Hamilton, Bishop of Dunkeld, and George Douglas of Pittendreich. Ninian thought he would have to stay near English-held Haddington or Broughty Castle. Arran was going to harvest Ormiston wood as a punishment, and was taking timber and stones from the house of Alexander Crichton of Brunstane for the new Spur blockhouse at Edinburgh Castle, (designed by Migliorino Ubaldini). Ninian had asked Andrew Dudley, the commander of Broughty, to write to Mary of Guise that he was well able to defeat any attack from French galleys. In August, Ninian told Grey of Wilton the news that Mary, Queen of Scots, had sailed for France from Dumbarton Castle.

In his History John Knox mentions that Ninian was involved in the trial of John Melville of Raith for treason. Knox, with some uncertainty, says Ninian discovered a compromising letter at the House of Ormiston. Raith's correspondence with his son in England was deemed treasonous. Raith was beheaded in December 1548. At this time, Ninian was in favour with Mary of Guise, who was Regent Arran's rival for power in Scotland, and he told Andrew Dudley he hoped to bring her round to the English cause.

== Officer of the Scots Guard ==
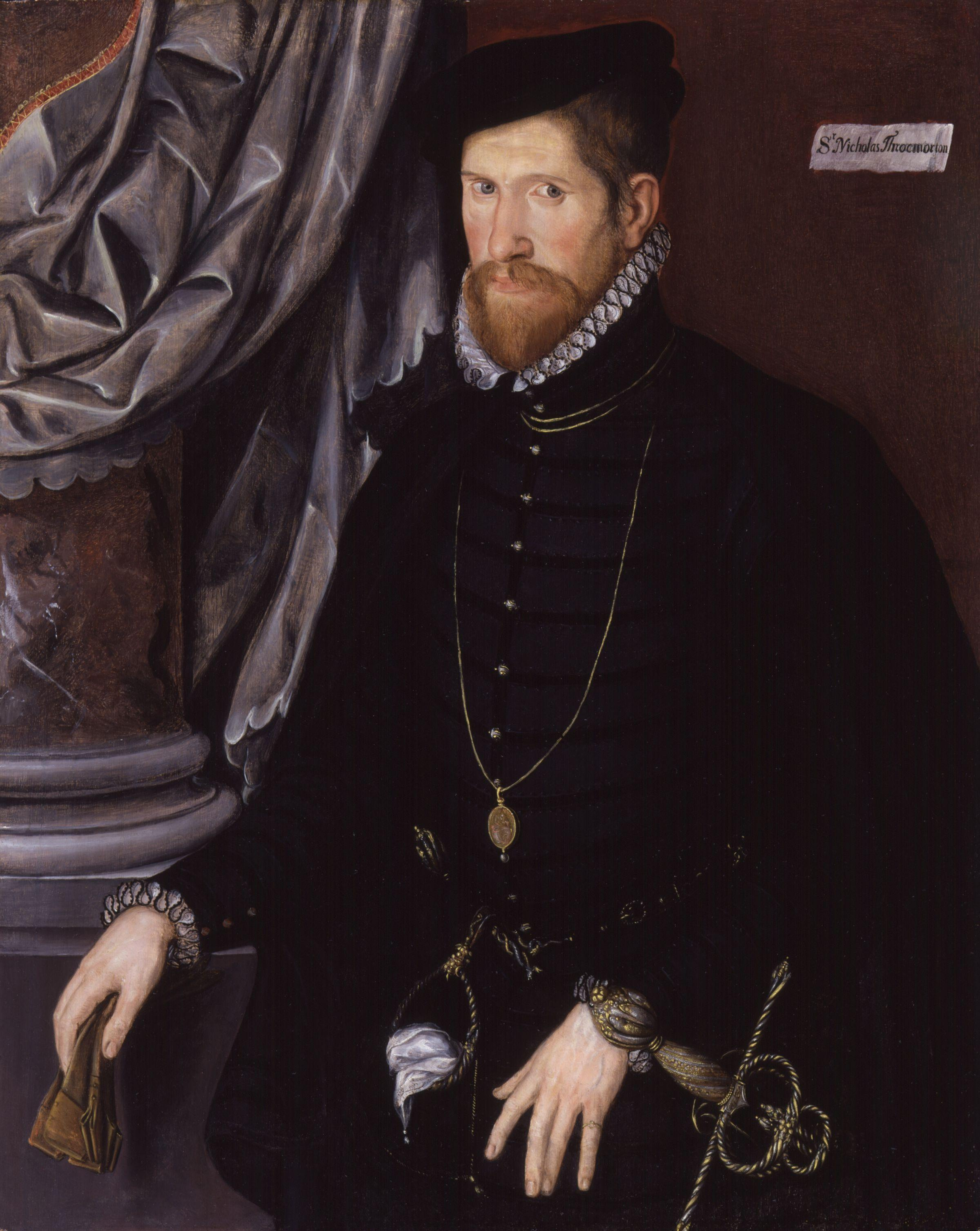
Nicholas Throckmorton gave Ninian the codename "George Beaumont"

On 31 July 1553, Ninian Cockburn wrote to Mary of Guise from Abbeville. He reported current news, and wrote that Mary, Queen of Scots, was well. He knew that her diplomat Henri Cleutin was in London, and thought that he would attend the coronation of Mary I.

The Scottish diplomat James Melville of Halhill recorded his meeting at St Germain en Laye with Ninian in 1553, who was now a Captain of Horse in the French king's guard. Mary of Guise was about to become Regent of Scotland in place of Regent Arran, and Ninian brought news from Scotland of the opinion of her political enemy John Hamilton, now Archbishop of St Andrews, who had been ill when Arran discussed relinquishing his powers to her. The Archbishop had recovered due to the care of the Italian physician Gerolamo Cardano. Melville was not pleased by Ninian's intervention and called him a "busy meddler". Melville described how Ninian tried to use him as an interpreter in an interview with Anne de Montmorency, Constable of France, and pretended Melville was his nephew. Melville conveyed his reluctance to proceed to the Constable and he dismissed Ninian from his presence in his cabinet in the Château before the tale was told. In December 1553, Montmorency received a very similar report of Arran and the Archbishop's intentions to retain Edinburgh Castle and Dumbarton Castle, sent by the ambassador, Antoine de Noailles, who had heard it from a banished Scotsmen in London.

In May 1557 Mary, Queen of Scots wrote to her mother from the Château of Villers-Cotterêts on behalf of "le Cappitaine Cokborne." Ninian urgently needed to return to Scotland to conclude a property transaction with Alexander Aitchison. The property had been held by John Camp (Kemp) and his wife Jean Sinclair, the queen's nurse. The lands concerned at "Gosfenot" had been occupied by French forces during the war with England. However, as Ninian was fully occupied in the king's service, Mary hoped the Queen Regent would settle the matter. ("Gosfenot" was perhaps near Gosford House at Longniddry, and the lands included a fort at Acheson's Haven).

During the crisis of the Scottish Reformation, Ninian's brother John, laird of Ormiston was involved in a major setback for the Protestant Lords of the Congregation. Ormiston carried £1,000 or 6,000 crowns from England to aid their fight against French troops in Scotland on 31 October 1559. The Earl of Bothwell ambushed him and after a sword fight captured the money. This caused diplomatic embarrassment as the English were caught out aiding Mary of Guise's rebels.

The English ambassador in Paris Nicholas Throckmorton considered sending Ninian to spy on the French at the siege of Leith in May 1560. Throckmorton described Ninian's rewards as an officer of the Scots Guard. He was a gentleman archer with a salary of 800 Francs, and was lord of the manor of Themis (or Captain of Feismes Castle) with an income of another 800 Francs. As an officer of the Guard, he commanded a company of 100 horsemen. Usefully, Ninian's wife, Elizabeth Kemp, was an attendant in the Privy Chamber of Mary, Queen of Scots in France. Throckmorton wanted Ninian to assume the name "Beaumont," and thereafter he continued to sign his letters to William Cecil as "George Beaumont."

On 22 and 23 June 1560, Ninian (as Beaumont) met Thomas Gresham at Antwerp. He told Gresham the French ambassador was planning on behalf of Francis II of France to write to James Hamilton, 3rd Earl of Arran, who had been commander of the Scot's Guard. Arran would be offered the Crown of Scotland and the withdrawal of French troops if he abandoned the plan for him to marry Elizabeth I of England

== Servant of Mary Queen of Scots ==
Mary Queen of Scots made Ninian chamberlain and factor of the Priory of Sciennes. His wife Elizabeth Kemp joined the queen's household in Scotland and she received Ninian's royal pension of £225 per year. Thomas Randolph gave Elizabeth a letter from Ninian to give to Mary. Ninian's letter had news of the French wars of religion that made the queen weep. Later, Randolph wrote that his report of the siege of Orléans had not "discomforted" her, but Ninian's plain speaking would do him little good in Scotland. Elizabeth died in 1565, they had a son Francis Cockburn.

Ninian continued in France in the Scots Guard, and sent William Cecil inaccurate reports of French subsidies given to Scotland. Hugh Fitzwilliam met him in Paris in September 1566, and wrote to Cecil that Ninian was friendly and helpful but his information was unreliable.

Ninian came to Scotland to the court of Mary in September 1565. He travelled through England, and at Berwick upon Tweed he met the Earl of Bedford who wrote that Ninian was "the same old man and had not changed his vein." Ninian reported to Cecil that he spoke to Mary discussing the political roles of the Earl of Lennox and the Earl of Bothwell, reminding her of the difficulties her father experienced banishing the Earl of Angus and George Douglas in 1529. He returned to France and was joined by his nephew, Christopher Cockburn, in November.

George Buchanan wrote that Ninian was in Scotland in 1567. Ninian raced back to the French court in June 1567 with news of Mary's capture at the battle of Carberry Hill. On the way he overtook her ambassador, William Chisholm, Bishop of Dunblane, who was ignorant of Mary's defeat, and upstaged him in front of Charles IX of France and Catherine de Medici.

== Working for the Regents of Scotland ==
Ninian was mostly stationed in Dieppe, though Catherine de Medici kept him at court in January 1568. In April 1568 his fellow archers wrote they wished he had been fighting alongside them at battle of Saint Denis. After Mary Queen of Scots went into exile in England, Ninian's correspondence with her half-brother Regent Moray, the English ambassador, and others was discovered in July 1568. He became a fugitive and lost all his offices and influence in France. The English ambassador, Henry Norris, reported that his house in Paris was raided just after he fled. Another agent, Master James Gordon was keen to step in his place.

Ninian returned to Scotland, and in October 1568 he travelled to York with Regent Moray for the conference discussing Mary's alleged crimes and the Casket letters. In Scotland, Ninian received payments from the Regents who ruled on behalf of James VI of Scotland. In August 1572 George Buchanan mentioned the Captain in a letter to Thomas Randolph. Buchanan was joking about the news of Randolph's marriage, and said he preferred in this case Captain Cockburn's "shrewd Scottish wit" to Randolph's "English Solomoniacal sapience", Randolph being sick in the head whilst Cockburn was infirm in the feet.

Ninian was sent to London on royal business carrying letters in July 1573. He was proud that he could still ride post-haste. At York the Lord President of the North looked at the date of the letters he carried from London and asked his age and marvelled. He reached Newcastle in a day and Berwick the next.

Regent Morton wrote to the Countess of Lennox on 19 August 1573. He had asked for her help to recover the jewels of Mary, Queen of Scots. He sent the letter with his "good friend" Ninian Cockburn, who had delivered some of the queen's jewels to Sir Valentine Browne.

Cockburn served at Morton's justice ayre at Peebles in 1574. He corresponded with the Earl of Leicester, who discussed his letters with Francis Walsingham. (Ninian warned of someone coming to Scotland from France, (possibly Esmé Stewart who arrived five years later). Morton sent Ninian to Berwick with letters in July 1575 but he broke his leg and was laid up at Coldingham. Morton sent the surgeon Gilbert Primrose to care for him.

Ninian recovered and went to the French court and England in August 1576. For this journey, Morton requested a passport for the "old gentlemen" from Cecil. In May 1578, Mary, Queen of Scots, wrote a letter in cipher code to the French ambassador in London, mentioning her distrust of Cockburn. Ninian carried another message to Cecil from Morton, who mentioned that Ninian was Cecil's "old acquaintance, not minded yet to settle himself for any age, but to visit the world after his accustomed manner."

Ninian died on 6 May 1579.

He had a son, Francis Cockburn, who was granted the office of chamberlain and factor of the Nunnery of Sciennes in June 1579, which his father had held.
