= Siege of Leith =

1560 Siege at Leith

- Part of the European wars of religion
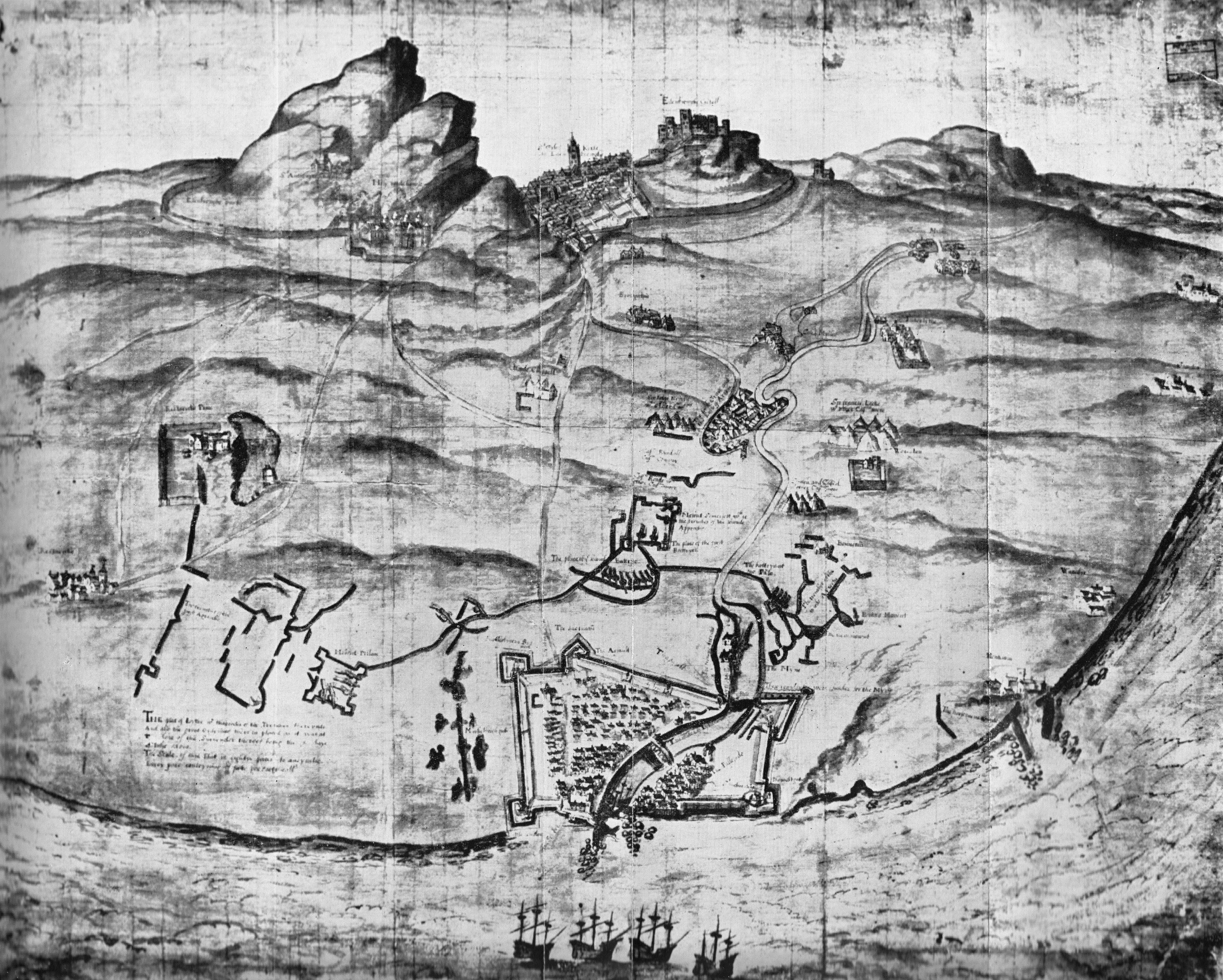
- Map of the siege of Leith dated 7 May 1560 from Petworth House
Date	1560
Location	Leith 55.974°N 3.172°W
Result	Catholic/French withstood siege.; Mary of Guise died during the peace process.; Treaty of Edinburgh signed with withdraw of English and French troops from Scotland.; Auld Alliance between Scotland and France was dissolved.

Belligerents
(Kingdom of Scotland) Catholic Scots (Kingdom of France) France	(Kingdom of Scotland) Protestant Scots; England

Commanders and leaders
Queen Mary of Guise; Henri Cleutin; Sébastien de Luxembourg; Jacques de la Brosse	James Hamilton; William Grey; James Croft; William Wynter

Strength
French soldiers in Leith (28 May 1560): 2,300; others 2,000; French evacuated from Scotland in July 1560: 3,613 men, 267 women, 315 children	English total (25 May 1560): 12,466

Casualties and losses
7 May 1560: 15	7 May 1560: English: 800; Scottish: 400

The siege of Leith ended a twelve-year encampment of French troops at Leith, the port near Edinburgh, Scotland. French troops arrived in Scotland by invitation in 1548. In 1560 the French soldiers opposed Scottish supporters of religious reformation, and an English army arrived to besiege the French garrison at Leith. The town was not taken by force and the French troops finally left peacefully under the terms of a treaty signed by Scotland, England and France.

== Background ==
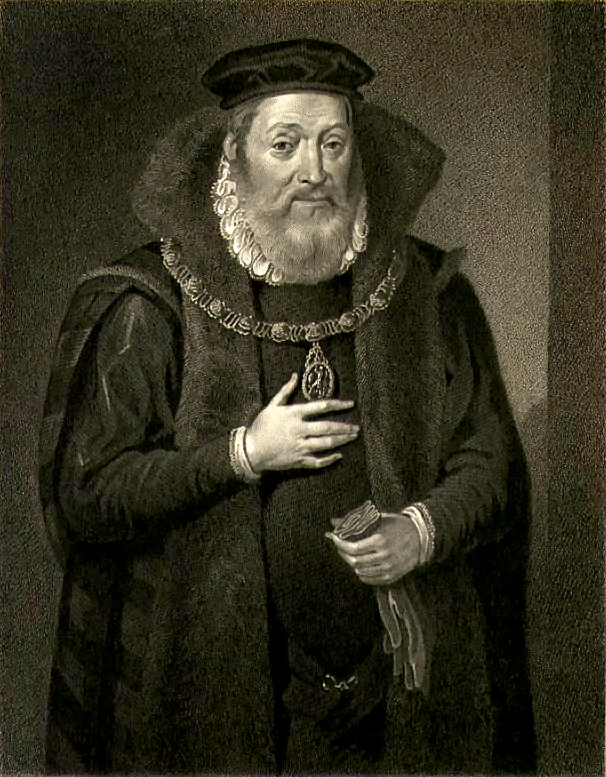
James Hamilton, Earl of Arran, Regent of Scotland from 1542 to 1554

=== The Auld Alliance and Reformation ===
Scotland and France had long been allies under the "Auld Alliance", first established in the 13th century. However, during the 16th century, divisions appeared between a pro-French faction at Court and Protestant reformers. The Protestants saw the French as a Catholic influence and, when conflict broke out between the two factions, called on English Protestants for assistance in expelling the French from Scotland.

In 1542, King James V of Scotland died, leaving only a week-old daughter who was proclaimed Mary, Queen of Scots. James Hamilton, Earl of Arran, was appointed Regent and agreed to the demand of King Henry VIII of England that the infant Queen should marry his son Prince Edward. This policy was soon reversed, however, through the influence of Mary's mother Mary of Guise and Cardinal Beaton, and Regent Arran rejected the English marriage offer. He then successfully negotiated a marriage between the young Mary and François, Dauphin of France.

=== War of the Rough Wooing ===
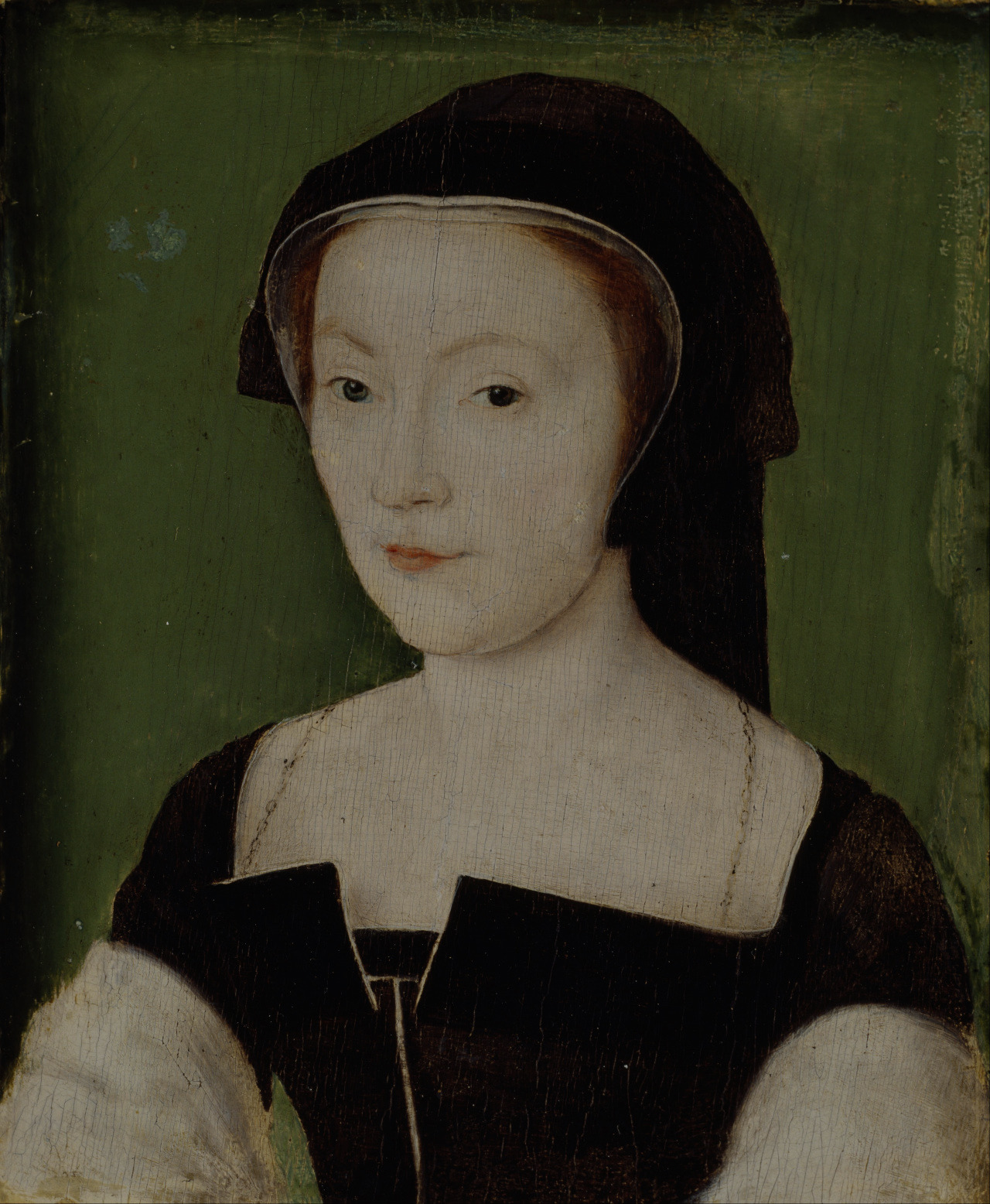
Mary of Guise, Regent of Scotland from 1554 to 1560

The English King Henry VIII, angered by the Scots reneging on the initial agreement for the royal marriage, made war on Scotland in 1544–1549, a period which the writer Sir Walter Scott later christened the "Rough Wooing". In May 1544, an English army landed at Granton and captured Leith to land heavy artillery for an assault on Edinburgh Castle, but withdrew after burning the town and the Palace of Holyrood over three days. Three years later, following another English invasion and victory at Pinkie in 1547, the English attempted to establish a kind of "pale" within southern Scotland. Leith was of prime strategic importance because of its vital role as Edinburgh's port, handling its foreign trade and essential supplies. The English arrived in Leith on 11 September 1547 and camped on Leith Links. The military engineer Richard Lee scouted around the town on 12 September looking to see if it could be made defensible. On 14 September the English began digging a trench on the south-east side of Leith near the Firth of Forth. William Patten wrote that the work was done as much for exercise as for defence, since the army only stayed for five days.

In response to the invasion Scotland looked to France for assistance, and on 16 June 1548 the first French troops arrived in Leith, soon to total 8,000 men commanded by André de Montalembert sieur d'Esse. The infant Queen Mary was removed to France the following month. In the following years the French interest became dominant in Scotland with increasing numbers of French troops, while English garrisons were established at Haddington, Dunglass, and Broughty Castle.

From 1548 onwards work began fortifying the port of Leith initially with a bulwark at the Kirkgate and at the chapel by the harbour (later the site of the Citadel), perhaps designed by the Italian Migliorino Ubaldini. The rest of the new fortifications were almost certainly designed by another Italian military engineer, Piero di Strozzi, and these represent the earliest use of the trace italienne style of artillery fortification in Britain. In August 1548 Strozzi directed the 300 or 500 Scottish workmen from a chair carried by four men because he had been shot in the leg at Haddington. In 1554, Mary of Guise, the Catholic French widow of James V, was appointed Regent in place of the Earl of Arran. Guise continued the pro-French policy, appointing Frenchmen to key positions in her government. In September 1559 she continued to improve the fortification at Leith and the island of Inchkeith with works which were probably designed by Lorenzo Pomarelli, an Italian architect and military engineer.

== The Reformation crisis ==
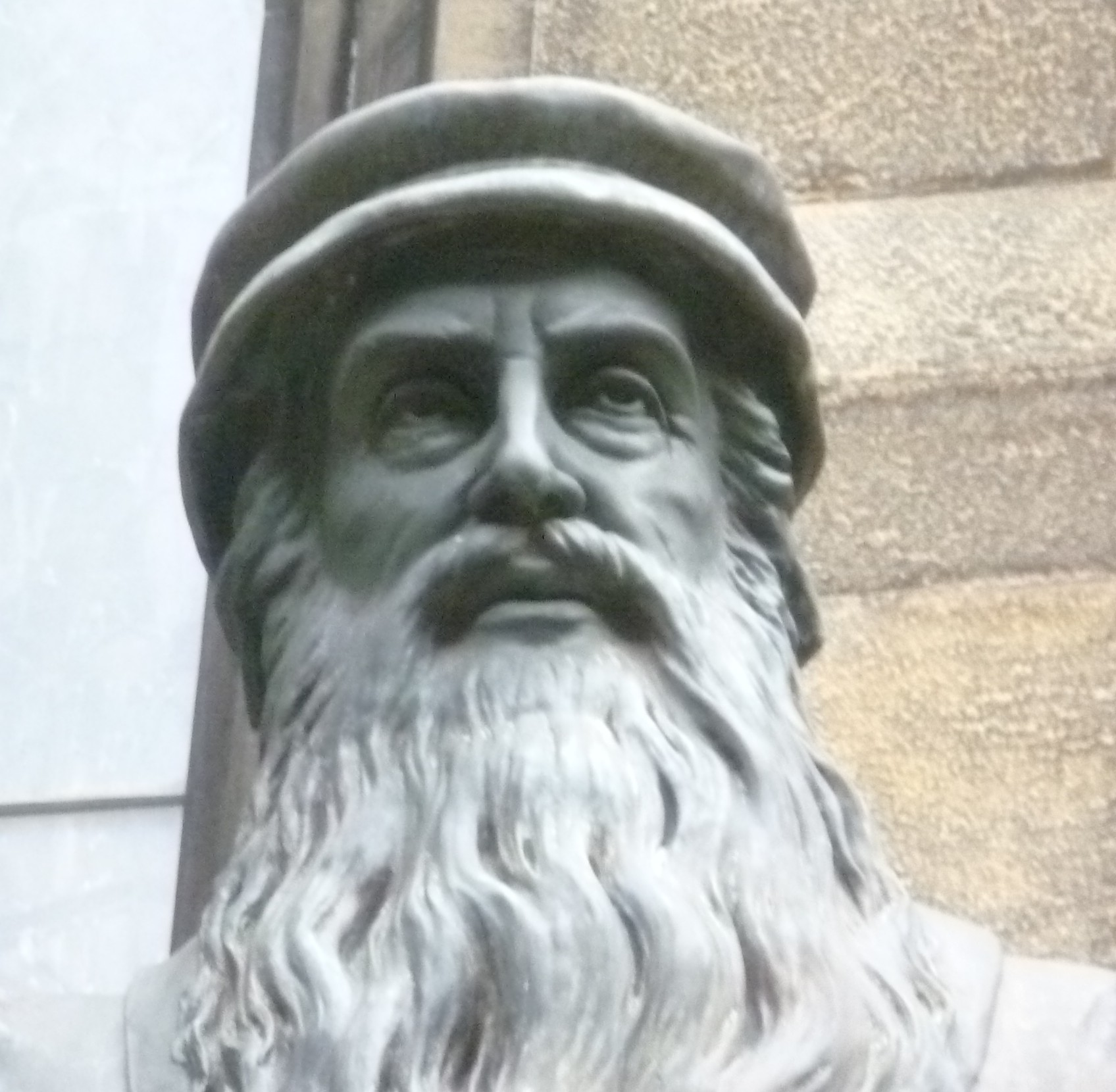
Head of the statue of John Knox, New College, Edinburgh

Scotland was a Catholic country. During the regency of Mary of Guise, the Protestant Scots became increasingly powerful, and politically active, particularly after the marriage of Mary and François in 1558. A group of noblemen, styling themselves the Lords of the Congregation, appointed themselves leaders of the anti-French, Protestant party, aligning themselves with John Knox and other religious reformers. They raised 12,000 troops in an attempt to oust the French from Scotland. Arran changed sides, joining the Lords of the Congregation. Meanwhile, Henry II of France was accidentally killed in a jousting tournament and Mary's husband became King of France on 10 July 1559.

In 1559 the Lords of the Congregation gained control of most of central Scotland and entered Edinburgh, forcing Mary of Guise to retreat to Dunbar Castle. However, with the aid of 2,000 French troops, she returned to Edinburgh in July. A short-lived truce was made with the Articles of Leith on 25 July 1559. Guise received further military aid from France, thanks to the influence of Jacques de la Brosse and the Bishop of Amiens. The Lords considered this assistance a breach of the Leith articles. The Duke of Châtellerault (the former Regent Arran), became a leader of the Lords of the Congregation in September 1559, and in response Mary of Guise refortified Leith. Châtellerault summoned other Scottish lords in October 1559, citing the French refortification of Leith:

...it is not unknawin how the Franchmen hes begun mair nor 20 dayis to fortifie the toun of Leyth, tending thairthrow to expell the inhabitantis thairoff and plant thame selffis, thair wyffis and bairnis thairintill suppressing the libertie of this realme. [sic]

Mary of Guise responded by making a proclamation on 2 October and writing to Lord Seton, Provost of Edinburgh, that it was well known that Leith was fortified as a response to the Congregation's intent to come in arms to Edinburgh on 8 October 1559, rather than to accommodate French troops and their families. She wrote, "we could do no less than provide ourselves with some sure retreat for ourselves and our company if we were pursued." The French, she said, had not brought their families. At least one English soldier, Hector Wentworth, joined the defenders of Leith.

Landowners affected by the new fortification works were compensated, one merchant William Dawson was granted exemption from any future customs duties for the loss of his building in North Leith. The Lords of the Congregation defied Mary of Guise and declared her regency suspended. They appealed to the Protestant Queen Elizabeth for English military support. In response to the situation, Elizabeth appointed the Duke of Norfolk to lead a diplomatic mission, and he met the Scots leaders to conclude the Treaty of Berwick. By this treaty, England now recognised the Lords of the Congregation as a power in Scotland, and safeguards were agreed for an English military intervention against the French in Scotland, with provisions for their withdrawal when the intervention was completed.

== The siege ==
=== Preparations for the siege ===
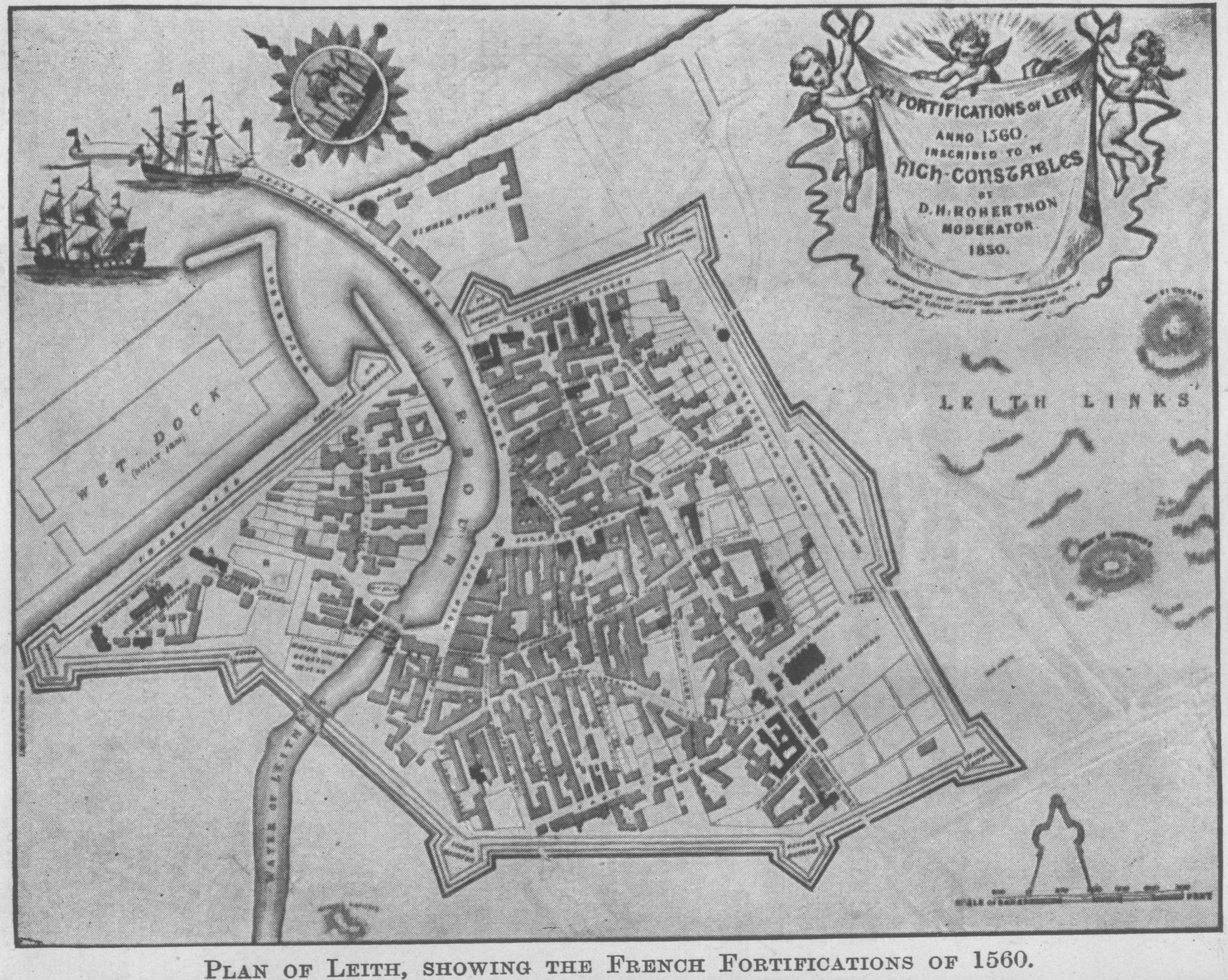
19th century plan showing the French fortifications of 1560

The French army continued to strengthen the fortifications of Leith during late 1559. The defences included eight projecting bastions, including Ramsay's Fort protecting the harbour, "Little london" at the north-east, and the Citadel at the north-west. Within the walls was a raised platform for guns, called a "cavalier" by the anonymous French journalist of the siege.

At the end of October, the Lords of the Congregation brought two guns to "Craigingalt" (Calton Hill) and began to bombard Leith. The French made a sortie on All Saints' Day, capturing an iron culverin which was taken Leith and the other cannon was broken and left on the roadway.

At the end of January 1560, an English fleet, under the command of William Wynter, arrived in the Firth of Forth, having sailed north from the naval base at Queenborough Castle in the Thames Estuary. English diplomats claimed Wynter's arrival in the Firth was accidental, and Norfolk told Wynter to act as if he was a maverick with no commission. The ships were sent by William Cecil under the authority of Queen Elizabeth. On 2 February, a proclamation was issued in the name of the Queen of Scots to summon the men of Selkirk and Jedburgh to be ready to mobilise against the "wicked doings of the English ships" in Scottish waters, and the intended invasion of the Merse and East Lothian.

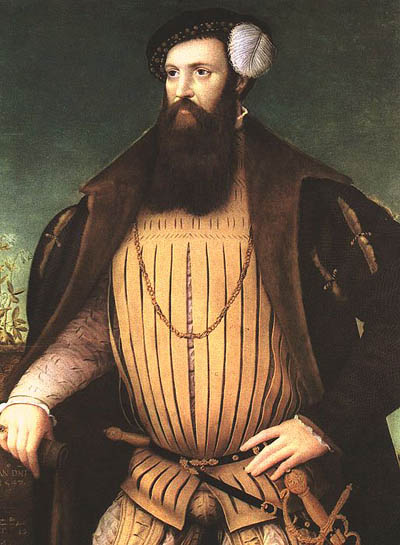
Portrait once thought to be Grey of Wilton, Scottish National Portrait Gallery

After the Treaty of Berwick provided a framework for an English military incursion, the English made plans to bring the army and guns to Leith. Considering the weather and difficulties of the road into Scotland, on 8 February 1559 Thomas Howard, 4th Duke of Norfolk and William Grey, 13th Baron Grey de Wilton wrote to the Lords of Congregation from Newcastle; "we find greate difficultie of the cariadge of the same by land at this tyme of the yere, as well by reason of the deepe and foule wayes between Barwick and Lythe, as also that for such a number of cariadges and draught horses as the same doth require can not be had in time, and therefore we suppose the same must of necessity be transported by sea, and the number of footmen also appointed for this journey to be set on land as near unto Lythe as may be convenientlie. And in that case, our horsemen to enter by land as soon as we have intelligence of the landing of our footmen."

In the event, an army of around 6,000 English soldiers, under Lord Grey de Wilton marched from Berwick, arriving in early April to join up with the Scottish Lords. Camping for a night at Halidon Hill, then at Dunglass and Lintonbriggs, the English army were at Prestongrange on 4 April where the lighter artillery pieces for the siege were landed from ships at Aitchison's Haven. Just before this English army arrived, the French raided Glasgow and Linlithgow. The French garrison at Haddington had withdrawn to the prepared position at Leith, swelling the number of French troops there to an estimated 3,000.

Meanwhile, Mary of Guise and her advisors stayed secure in Edinburgh Castle from 28 March 1560. The Keeper of the castle, John Erskine declared it neutral, and this was respected by both sides, and the castle played no part in the conflict. Before the English army arrived at Leith, the commander William Grey of Wilton considered that capturing the castle with the Queen Regent might be a better option. However, the Duke of Norfolk advised him against it, as their proper target was the French soldiery in Leith, not Erskine's Scottish garrison.

=== Battle of Restalrig ===
When the Duke of Norfolk arrived at Berwick in January 1560, Mary of Guise's military advisor Jacques de la Brosse wrote to him saying he did not believe the rumour in Edinburgh that Norfolk was Elizabeth's lieutenant-general in Scotland, there to attack the French and favour the rebels, against the peace treaty between Scotland and England. However, that was exactly Norfolk's mission. Norfolk remained at Berwick, instructed that Grey of Wilton was to have charge of "martial affairs" in Scotland, as Grey himself wished, while Ralph Sadler, a long-serving diplomat, was to forward a peaceable settlement with Mary of Guise by diplomacy, liaising with the Duke of Châtellerault and his party. Elizabeth appointed James Croft to be Grey of Wilton's deputy. Ralph Sadler was given Grey's border administrative roles at Berwick upon Tweed.

Grey of Wilton set his camp at Restalrig village on 6 April 1560 and twice offered to parley with Mary of Guise and the French military commander Henri Cleutin, Sieur d'Oysel et Villeparisis via the English Berwick Pursuivant. This offer was refused, and the English herald Rouge Croix was sent to demand that the French withdraw from the field into Leith. Cleutin replied that his troops were on his master and mistress's ground.

Soon after this exchange fighting broke out at Restalrig with casualties on both sides. Some French mounted arquebusiers who pursued an English detachment were killed on the slopes above Leith, or captured by the sea-shore. Over 100 French casualties were reported with 12 officers killed and a number of prisoners taken. George Buchanan and John Hayward's 17th century history make the point that the French were trying to secure the high-ground to the south of Leith: Hawkhill, the crag (at Lochend), and the chapel, which the French journalist of the siege called the "Magdalene Chapel". Hayward and Mary's secretary John Lesley mentioned that George Howard and James Croft were parleying with Mary of Guise at the spur blockhouse of Edinburgh Castle when the fighting started.

=== Mount Pelham ===
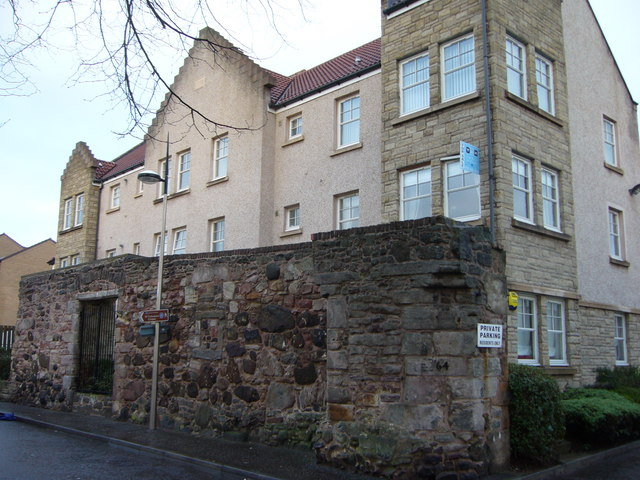
A surviving wall of Restalrig Deanery, where Grey of Wilton set up headquarters

Norfolk reported that, "Restaricke Deanrie is so sweete, that our campe lyeth not within halfe a myle and more of our trenches." The English began constructing their siege-works against the town in mid-April. There were trenches on the Hawkhill ridge north of Restalrig and towards Lochend Castle. South of Leith Links, at the latter-day site of Hermitage House, below the Magdalen Chapel on the ridge, there was a fortlet, "Mount Pelham" named after the captain of the pioneers, William Pelham. Pelham led a force of 400 pioneers. The fort faced across the present-day Leith Links towards the eastern side of the town and South Leith Church.

Mount Pelham was developed from a trench dug on the night of 12 April and finished 13 days later as a sconce with four corner bastions. An eyewitness, Humfrey Barwick later wrote that he suggested that Pelham should begin his fort "at the fwte of this hill and run straight to yonder hillocke," presumably meaning by hillock the "Giant's Brae" and "Lady Fyfe's Brae" on Leith Links. Captain Cuthbert Vaughan was the fortlet's commander with 240 men. Five years earlier, Vaughan and James Croft had been imprisoned as supporters of Lady Jane Grey, and they subsequently took part in Wyatt's Rebellion. Vaughan was killed in 1563, at the siege of Newhaven in France. Both Holinshed and George Buchanan mention the fort was too far from Leith for its cannon to have much effect on the town.

Military engineers in English service included the Italian Giovanni Portinari, who brought plans for the assault of strong towns and made a plan of the French fortifications known as a plat. While the English were at work in April, the French also constructed and manned entrenchments outside of the main walls encircling the town.

=== The bombardment ===
The English had brought some small cannon with them. Holinshed records that the carriages and shot for the large siege guns were landed on 10 April 1560 and the guns on the next day. The Scottish chronicle, the Diurnal of Occurrents, notes that 12 heavier English artillery pieces were emplaced to the east of Leith, with 15 smaller guns that had been transported by land.

On 12 April, the French heard a rumour that the English believed they were underequipped, and their response was to give a salvo from their 42 cannon, killing 16 in the English camp. The large guns were ready on Sunday 14 April, Easter day, and the English bombardment began. The cannon were placed in batteries to the west and south of Leith. According to a later chronicle, the History of the Estate of Scotland, the besiegers' guns were placed at the same distance of "twoe fflight shott" from South Leith church as Mount Pelham. The chronicle calls the location "Clayhills".

The English plan of Leith, dated 7 July 1560, marks the position of the "first battery" to the south west of the Church, lying in front of the later gun position called "Mount Somerset", at Pilrig. The French journal also mentions Pilrig as well as the entrenchment at Pelham, and a rumour that the newly arrived English great guns would be placed in the trenches on Hawkhill to the south. The French returned fire from cannon on the steeple of St Anthony's church, Logan's Bulwark, and the Sea Bulwark.

John Lesley, Bishop of Ross, wrote that despite the bombardment, the French commanders and Father Andrew Leich celebrated Easter mass in South Leith Parish Church. During the service a cannonball passed harmlessly in through a window and out of the church door, while outside the air was thick with broken stone and plaster. This story was omitted from the contemporary Scots Language manuscript of Lesley's History.

=== Mount Pelham overwhelmed ===
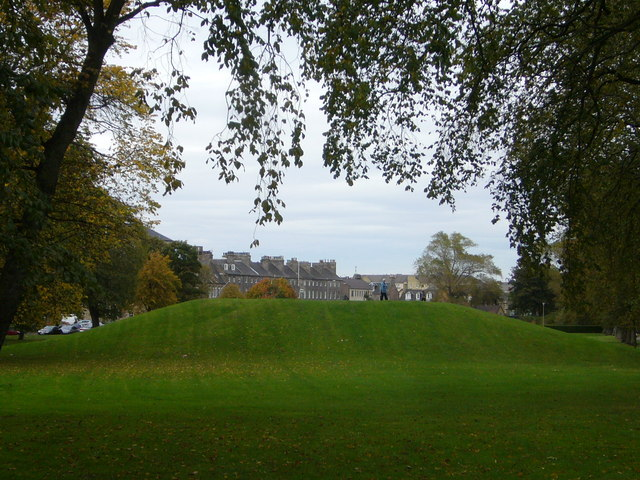
The Giant's Brae on Leith Links, near the site of the 1560 siegework Mount Pelham

The next day, 16 April, according to the French journal of the siege, 60 French cavalry and 1,200 foot soldiers overwhelmed the unfinished English position at Mount Pelham and spiked four cannons, killing 200 men and taking officers as prisoners. Arthur Grey, the son and biographer of Grey de Wilton, who was commander of a company of demi-lance horsemen, was shot twice, but was not in danger of losing his life. The French were repulsed and Norfolk reported 150 killed on both sides. Humfrey Barwick blamed Arthur Grey's injury on William Pelham not securing the position properly while the fortlet was under construction.

According to a poem by Thomas Churchyard, a Scotswoman initiated this attack by signalling an opportunity to the French. She came with Scottish victuallers to the English position and made her sign from a crag where a cannon had been placed. This story may refer to the existing mounds near the site of Mount Pelham called the "Giant's Brae" and "Lady Fyfe's Brae". The Leith historian Alexander Campbell, writing in 1827, regarded the mounds as important monuments of the siege, writing that the eastern mound took its name from "Lady Fife's Well", and children called the larger mound by the Grammar School "the Giant's Brae". This was repeated by D.H. Robertson, and the 1852 Ordnance Survey map marked the Giant's Brae as (the remains of) Somerset's Battery with Lady Fyfe's Brae as (the remains of) Pelham's Battery. A more recent writer, Stuart Harris, dismissed the assertion that these mounds were siegeworks rather than natural hillocks, stating that the belief was a "spurious tradition".

The Diurnal of Occurrents records another attack on the completed Mount Pelham on 18 June by 300 French soldiers who were chased back to Leith by 30 English cavalry. Forty French were killed, seven captured, and the English lost their trumpeter.

=== Mount Somerset, Mount Falcon, and Byer's Mount ===
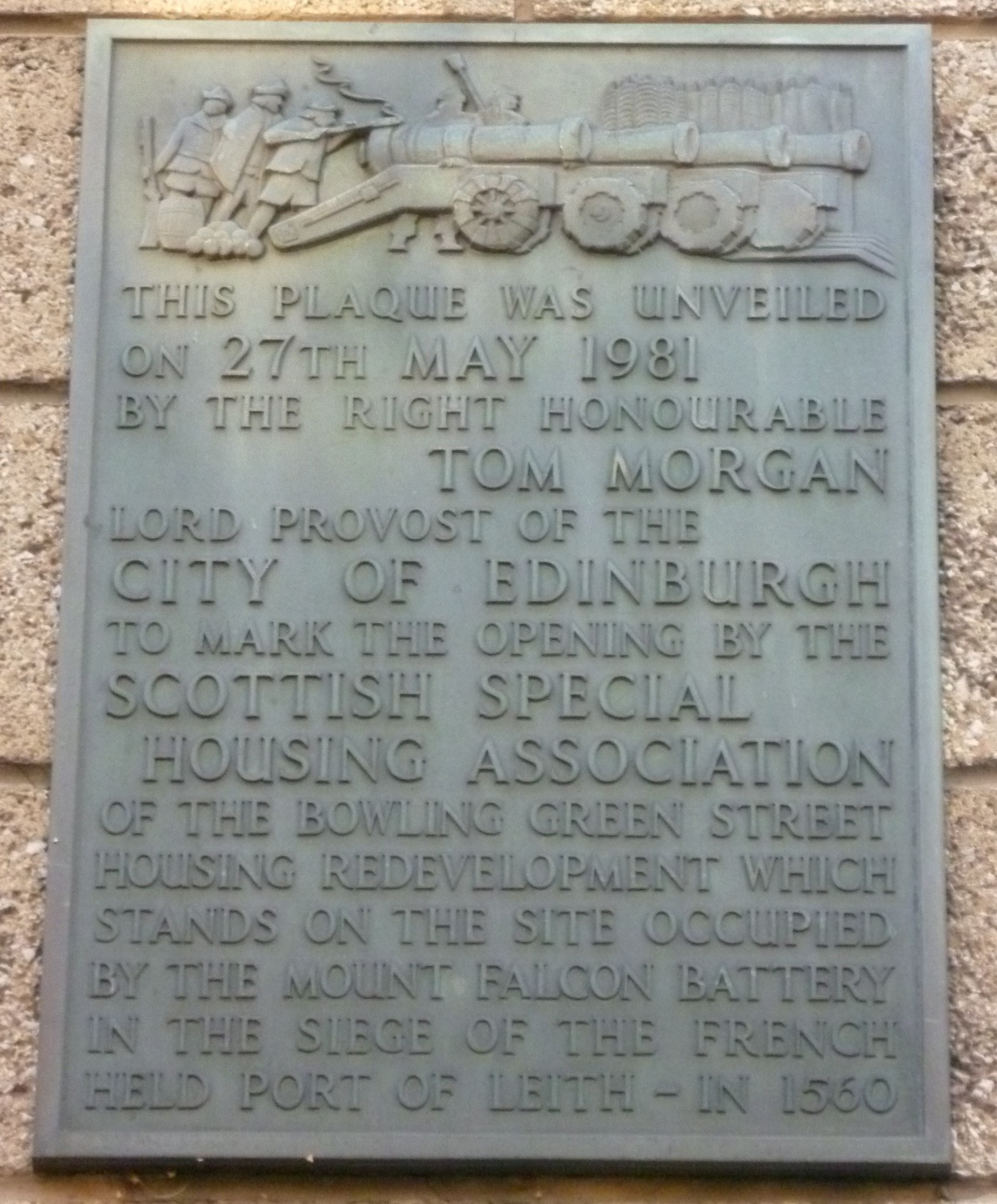
Modern plaque at the site of the Mount Falcon battery

At the end of April the siege works were extended westwards and a new emplacement built in the vicinity of the later Pilrig House, named "Mount Somerset" after Captain Francis Somerset, whom Thomas Churchyard identifies as the brother of the Earl of Worcester. Among the Scots recorded at the siege at this time, on 27 April 1560 with a tent (palzoun) at the Water of Leith, were Robert and John Haldane of Gleneagles.

The works were continued further west and north, across the Water of Leith to Bonnington, where a series of batteries were established. "Mount Falcon" was built after 7 May 1560 and, according to John Lesley, commanded the houses on the Shore quayside. The battery was placed west of a bend in the Water of Leith, near the intersection of South Fort Street and West Bowling Green Street.

A position to the north with a single cannon is marked "Byers Mownt" on the Petworth map. Stuart Harris locates the gun's position near the intersection of the present-day Ferry Road and Dudley Avenue South. The completed emplacements stretched for approximately 1 mile (1.6 km) around the fortified town, with six gun sites at a distance of around 500 yards (460 m) from the Leith ramparts. Mounts Pelham and Somerset, named after their officers, were both large temporary forts with ramparts up to 13 feet (4.0 m) high. Apart from the foot soldiers, there were, on 25 May 145 English artillery-men, with 750 English and 300 Scottish pioneers or labourers working on the fortifications, and 468 men looking after work-horses.

=== 7 May – an English defeat ===
Elizabeth and her secretary William Cecil were exerting pressure on Norfolk for a result at Leith. To show that progress was being made, Norfolk started forwarding Grey's dispatches and apologising for his depute's "humour", asking that Elizabeth should send Grey a letter showing her thanks. Norfolk brought in expert military advisors, Sir Richard Lee and his own cousin Sir George Howard, who Norfolk believed would bring the siege to a rapid conclusion. Norfolk wrote to William Cecil on 27 April that it was a shame to have "to lie so long at a sand wall."

It was planned to storm the town before daybreak on 7 May. In early May cannon were deployed to make a substantial breach in the western ramparts. The assault was to be carried out in two waves, the first at 3.00 am by 3,000 men, the second by 2,240, with a further 2,400 holding back to keep the field. William Winter would wait for a signal to land 500 troops on the quayside of the Water of Leith at the Shore inside the town. As a diversion, Cuthbert Vaughan's 1,200 men with 500 Scotsmen were to attack from the south, crossing Leith Links from Mount Pelham. James Croft's men would assault from the north-west, presumably at low-tide.

There was an accidental fire in Leith on 1 May which burnt in the south-west quarter. The next evening Grey planted his battery against the west walls and started firing before 9.00 am, writing to Norfolk that his gunners had not yet found their mark. The next day, Grey was worried that the French had effected repairs so the town appeared even stronger. He continued with the bombardment and ordered his captains to try small-scale assaults against the walls to gather intelligence. Cuthbert Vaughan measured the ditch and ramparts for making scaling ladders.

The attempt was now scheduled for 4.00 am on Tuesday 7 May and by two hours past daylight the English were defeated. Although there were two breaches, the damage to the walls was insufficient. None of the flanking batteries were disabled, and the scaling ladders were too short. The result was heavy losses estimated at 1,000 to 1,500 Scots and English. A report by Peter Carew estimated a third of the dead were Scottish. However, Carew's total of six-score dead, which was followed by George Buchanan, is roughly a tenth of the other reports. The accountant and victualler of Berwick, Sir Valentine Browne noted there were 1,688 men unable to serve, still on the payroll, hurt at the assault or at various other times, and now sick or dead. The author of the Diurnal of Occurrents put the total number slain at 400. Humfrey Barwick was told the French collected the top-coats of the English who had reached and died on the walls, and 448 were counted. The French journal claims only 15 defenders were killed. John Knox and the French journal attributed some of the casualties to the women of Leith throwing stones from the ramparts.

According to Knox, Mary of Guise surveyed her victory from the fore-wall of Edinburgh Castle with some pleasure, comparing the English dead laid on the walls of Leith to fair tapestry, laid out to air in the sun:

The Frenche, prowd of the victorie, strypit naikit all the slayne, and laid thair carcassis befoir the hot sune alang thair wall, quhair thay sufferit thame to lye ma dayis nor ane, unto the quhilk, quhen the Quene Regent luikit, for myrth sche happit and said, "Yonder are the fairest tapestrie that I ever saw, I wald that the haill feyldis that is betwix this place and yon war strewit with the same stuiffe."

Knox thought James Croft had not wholeheartedly played his part. Carew heard that Croft should have attacked a breach in the Pale: instead his men "ran up between the Church and the water." Norfolk blamed Croft, who he believed colluded with Guise, later writing, "I thought a man could not have gone nigher a traitor than Sir James, I pray God make him a good man." Richard Lee made a map of Leith, which Norfolk sent to London on 15 May. This map or "platte" was perhaps made as much for the enquiry into the 7 May events as for future works. Elizabeth read Carew and Valentine's reports and sent them to William Cecil with instructions to keep them safe and secret.

=== Mines and code ===
Now diplomatic efforts for peace were re-doubled, but the siege was tightened. The English brought specialists from Newcastle upon Tyne to dig mines towards the fortifications. Mary of Guise, who was very ill by this time, wrote a letter to d'Oysel asking him to send her drugs from Leith. This letter was passed to Grey of Wilton who was suspicious because medicines could be easily found in Edinburgh. According to John Knox, he held the letter in the heat of a fire and discovered a message in invisible ink. Grey threw the letter on the fire. The French journal of the siege puts the story on 5 May, and says that Guise required ointment from one Baptiste in Leith, and the secret cipher on the back of the letter was "insert the notice of the English enterprise and other matters." Grey spoilt the letter looking for the secret writing and could not return it to James Drummond, the trumpet messenger.

Coded letters were carried out of Leith by another soldier, a drummer messenger of the Lords of the Congregation. First, Captain Sarlabous got him to take a note to a lady-in-waiting of Mary of Guise which had a secret cipher on the back. On 9 May he took a message with a handkerchief containing information about the English mines. An English secretary in Paris, John Somers or Sommer, managed make an alphabet or cipher key for some of the codes used by Guise and French diplomats. Mary of Guise discovered that the English and their allies had one of her cipher keys when a copy of a letter to her was found, deciphered and translated into the Scots language.

Mary of Guise sent letters to d'Oysel describing what her spies had found out about these works. On 19 May she wrote in code that the English were mining at the Citadel, St Anthony's Flanker, and the Mill Bulwark. The English were confident that their mines would be deeper than any French counter-mines. Guise now found it more difficult to send her letters into Leith, and this one was captured and deciphered.

The English ambassador in France, Nicholas Throckmorton, discovered that Mary of Guise had obtained details of the plans for the 7 May assault. She had also changed her ciphers. Throckmorton intercepted a letter meant for Jacques de la Brosse from Mary of Guise's brothers. He hoped to infiltrate his agent Ninian Cockburn into Leith posing as the messenger. He gave Ninian, a captain in the Garde Écossaise, the alias "Beaumont".

By 18 June 1560, after Mary of Guise had died, the French at Edinburgh Castle realised their cipher was in English hands, and they advised the Leith garrison to continue to use the code in letters that might be captured, to spread disinformation that would be advantageous in the ongoing peace negotiations. The coded advice letter itself was intercepted by the English and deciphered. The letter also suggested the use of fire signals to advertise how much longer they could last, as food was short, for the benefit of the French diplomats at Edinburgh Castle. Signal beacons were to be lit on St Anthony's Church or the Citadel or both, half an hour before midnight. The letter was obtained in Edinburgh by William Cecil who hoped that either Mr Hampton (Bernard Hampton) or "Mr Sommer" could decipher it. Cecil would have paid £100 to have Somers with him in Edinburgh. The text was deciphered, put into "Throckmorton's cipher", and sent back to the negotiators in Edinburgh.

=== Hunger in Leith ===
On 8 May, after the assault, Grey sent Francis Killinghale to London carrying a detailed analysis of the situation. Grey was worried about deserters "stealing" back into England, but he thought that with reinforcements he could take the town by storm, or enclose it and starve out the garrison, as there was already "great scarcity" within. Ralph Sadler also wrote of desertions and the weariness of the besiegers. The French continued to make sallies from the town, despite their dwindling provisions. The besiegers, conversely, were supplied with more troops and provisions from England and Scotland.

Grey described his men killing 40 or 50 French soldiers and others who came out of the town to gather cockles and periwinkles on 13 May. The French journalist wrote of the same event, relating that some of the hungry townspeople went out to collect shell-fish and were attacked by the English. A little French boy taken on the shore was brought to Grey of Wilton. When asked if they had enough food for a fortnight, the boy said he had heard the captains say the English would not take the town by famine or force for four or five months yet. Raphael Holinshed puts this event on 4 July, saying that Grey first issued a warning to d'Oysel about the cockle-pickers.

The 17th century writer John Hayward gave a description of famine in the town based on the account of an English prisoner in Leith called Scattergood. He said the inhabitants and troops were reduced to eating horses, dogs, cats and vermin, with leaves, weeds and grass, "seasoned with hunger".

"Hereupon they grewe very short in strength of men, and no lesse short in provision of foode for those men which they had; the one happeninge to tress for them by the force of their enimies, the other either by disabilitie or negligence of their freinds; so, their old stoore beinge spent, they were inforced to make use of every thinge out of which hunger was able to drawe nourishement. The fleshe of horses was then more daintie then ever they esteemed venison before; doggs, catts, and vermine of more vile nature were highelie valued; vines were striped of their leaves and tender stalkes; grasse and weedes were picked up, and, beinge well seasoned with hunger, were reputed amonge (them) for dainties and dilicate dishes."

Holinshed mentions Hayward's source, Scattergood, as a spy who entered Leith pretending to be a fugitive or deserter. Peter Carew reported on 28 May 1560 that the French had no meat or drink except water for three weeks. There was only bread and salted salmon. These were rationed with 126 ounces of bread for a man each day and a salmon between six men each week. There were 2,300 French soldiers in Leith and more than 2,000 others.

After Mary of Guise died, a week's truce was declared on Monday 17 June. On 20 June, French and English soldiers ate together on the beach. Captain Vaughan, Andrew Corbett, Edward Fitton and their men brought beef, bacon, poultry, wine and beer: the French brought cold roast capon, a horse pie and six roast rats. William Cecil and Nicholas Wotton thought reports of a lack of food in Leith were exaggerated. The French had access to fresh fish and had two fishing boats with nets. They had been able to send provisions to Inchkeith. The ordinary townsfolk however had been driven to extremity, forced "to seek their living by cockles and other shellfish upon the sea sands".

== Treaty of Edinburgh ==
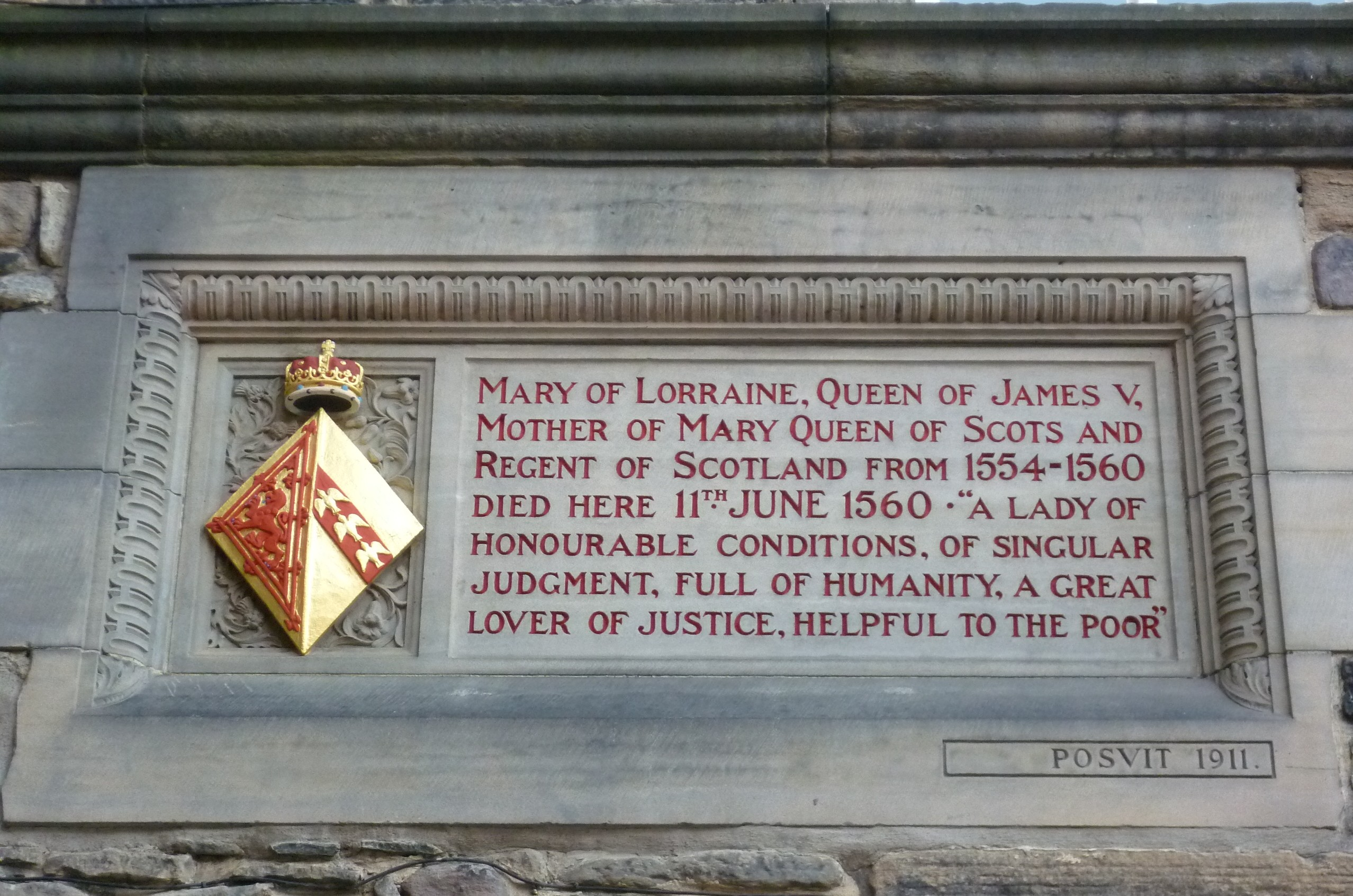
Mary of Guise tablet, Edinburgh Castle

After the English assault on 7 May, peace talks progressed with the Laird of Findater and Master John Spence acting for Guise. There was dinner at Edinburgh Castle on 12 May for Mary of Guise and the Lords of the Congregation, but negotiations failed the next day when the French commanders in Leith were not permitted to come to the Castle and meet Guise to discuss the proposals. A fresh attempt at negotiations began in June. Commissioners, including the Count of Randon and the Bishop of Valence for the French, and William Cecil and Nicholas Wotton for the English, arrived in Edinburgh, only to find that Mary of Guise, Regent of Scotland, had died at Edinburgh Castle on 11 June.

Her death demoralised the French, and the commissioners agreed a week's armistice on 17 June. This ended on 22 June, but the only further military action was a skirmish on 4 July. Peace was agreed shortly after and proclaimed on 7 July in the names of Elizabeth, Queen of England, and François and Mary, King and Queen of France and Scotland.

The peace became known as the Treaty of Leith or the Treaty of Edinburgh. It secured the withdrawal of both French and English troops from Scotland and effectively dissolved the 265 year old Auld Alliance. By 17 July the foreign soldiers had left the city. The total number of French evacuated from Scotland to Calais under William Winter's supervision was 3,613 men, 267 women, and 315 children—in all 4,195 with Lord Seton and the Bishop of Glasgow. The terms of the treaty allowed 120 French soldiers to remain at Inchkeith and Dunbar, although the defences of Leith were to be immediately demolished. New outworks at Dunbar Castle, which were still being completed by an Italian military engineer in May, were scheduled for demolition. The defences of Leith were slighted by English soldiers on 15 July and some strong points or bulwarks undermined. Richard Lee made another plan of Leith in July 1560.

A key term was that François and Mary should cease using the style and arms of the King and Queen of England. As Catholics, they regarded Elizabeth, daughter of Anne Boleyn, as illegitimate, leaving Mary herself as the rightful Queen. Their use of the English royal arms led the French to dub the campaign the "War of the Insignia". Queen Mary never ratified the agreement, since by doing so she would have acknowledged Elizabeth as rightful Queen of England, and she did not wish to relinquish her own claim to the English throne.

Edinburgh's town treasurer paid for the Shore of Leith to be cleaned after the evacuation, and a gun found in the ditches was taken to Edinburgh. A ship scuttled by the French to block the harbour of Newhaven was floated off in September 1560 over two successive high tides by men working from small boats. Two hundred Scottish workmen were working to remove the fortifications.

== Legacy ==
=== The School of War ===
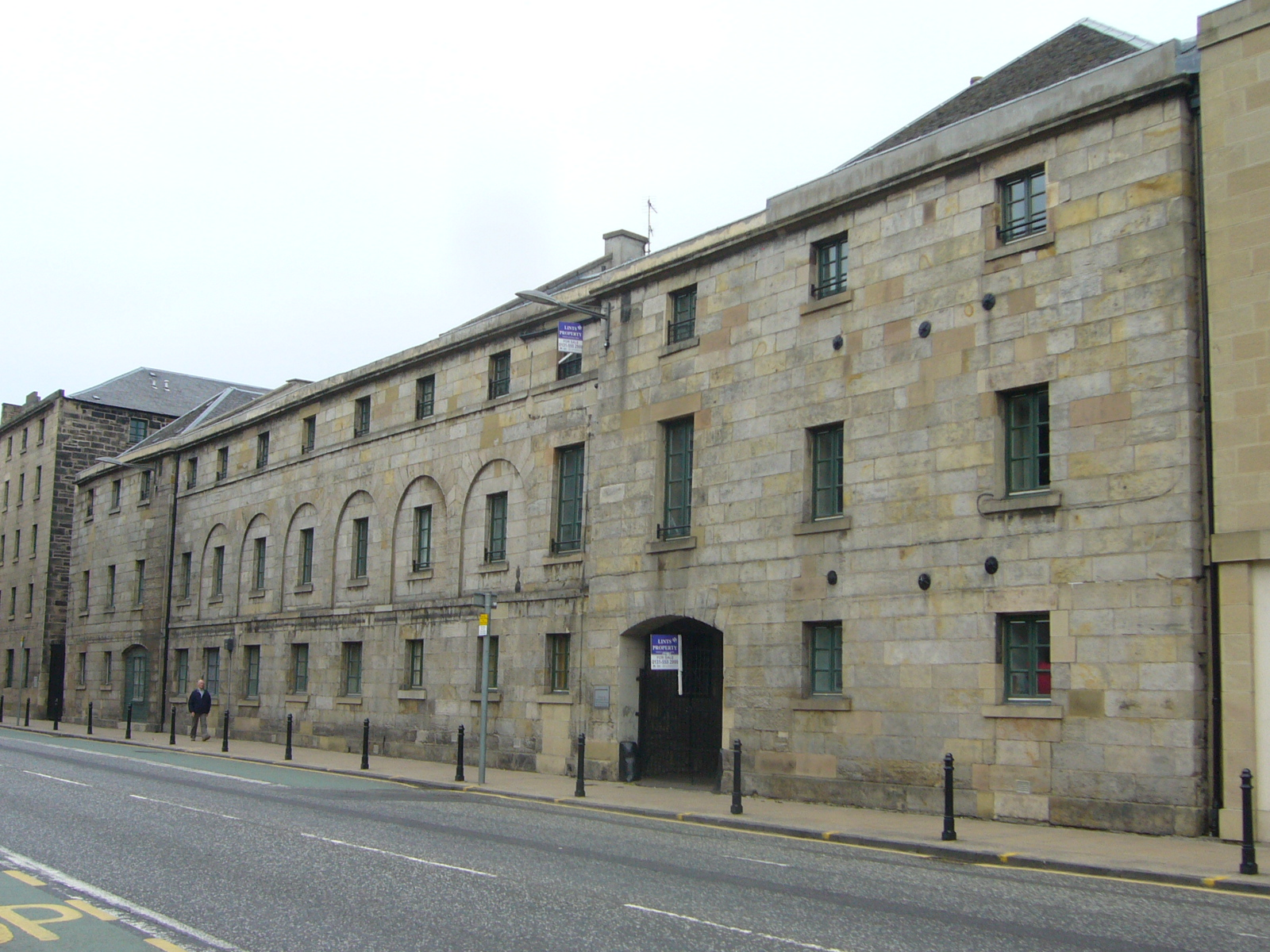
Crabbie's Warehouse in Great Junction Street follows the line of the French fortification

As this was the first military conflict of the reign, Elizabethan writers called the siege the "School of War", a title used by Thomas Churchyard for his poem narrating the action of the siege. Churchyard describes a Scottish woman who signalled to the French from a gun emplacement on Hermitage rock before defeat on 7 May 1560.

Among our men, might Scottish vittlers haunt
Who with the French a treason tooke in hand
A wife, a queane, did make the French a grant
Upon this rock in sight of Leith to stand :
And there to make a sign to Dozie's band,
When that the ward were careless and at rest
Which she did keep, her self the same confessed.

Churchyard also wrote that the French tried to take Pelham's mount disguised as serving women:

By deep foresight, a mount there was devised
Which bare the name of Pelham for the space
I had forgot, how Frenchmen came disguised
In women's weeds, like queanes with muffled face
They did no act, but soon they took the chase.

The 17th-century playwright William Sampson set his The Vow-Breaker, or The Fayre Maid of Clifton around the soldiers recruited for Leith from Nottinghamshire under Captain Jervis Clifton. The Vow-Breaker, published in 1636, contains much historical detail. It is written as if it was performed at Nottingham Castle in September 1562 for a meeting between Elizabeth and Mary, Queen of Scots, which never took place. The 450th anniversary in 2010 saw a celebration of the end of the siege with performances in Leith of a new play telling the story.

== Archaeology and fortifications ==
There is still significant evidence of the fortifications built by the French and batteries built by the English, and new examples were uncovered in 2001, 2002 and 2006. The site of the Mount Falcon battery near Byer's Mount is marked by a plaque, and the two mounds on Leith Links are scheduled monuments. An excavation at South Fort Street in 2016 may have uncovered remains of the English ditches at Mount Falcon.

The ramparts were ordered to be demolished at the conclusion of the siege by Edinburgh townsfolk on the orders of the Lords and Burgh council to, "make blockhouse and curtain equal with the ground." Progress was slower than English observers wanted, and in August 1560 Little London and Loggan's bulwark were still "clean whole". At the end of September, there were 200 workman called "pioneers" demolishing the ramparts.

Some repairs to the walls were made in 1572 during the "War between Leith and Edinburgh" using turf called "faill" in the accounts. In April 1594 supporters of Francis Stewart, 5th Earl of Bothwell, rebels against James VI of Scotland, repaired the fortifications.

In the 19th-century Great Junction Street and Constitution Street were laid along the line of the southern and eastern walls respectively.

=== War of the Three Kingdoms and the Citadel ===
On 20 March 1639 Lord Newburgh reported on the activities of the Scottish Covenanters at Leith, where women were working on the walls; "they work hard at their new fortification at Leith, where the ladies and women of all sorts serve with wheelbarrows and baskets". Women were rarely recorded in manual work on Scottish building sites, the other examples are at Dumbarton Castle (1620) and Inchkeith (1555).

A part of the ramparts were reconstructed in 1649 during the war of the Three Kingdoms. The renewed fortifications were held for Charles II, as King of Scots. Leith and the Citadel were bombarded by Rear-Admiral Captain Hall on 29 July 1650 from the Liberty, the Heart frigate, the Garland and the Dolphin.

General Monck had a magazine at South Leith Church. The controversy over the rights of Leith merchants to be independent of Edinburgh was revived at this time. The Citadel fort was built at a new site to the north-west from 1656 with an advance of £3,000 Scots from Edinburgh burgh council. The total cost was around £100,000 sterling. The Citadel was built over St Nicholas Vennel and the glebe of North Leith church and several houses and gardens. It had angle bastions and a moat.

Some stone and timber was brought from the ruins of Wardie Castle, and stone was taken from a quarry at Wardie. The master mason John Milne obtained stones from the demolition of houses that were adjacent to the walls of Edinburgh and from the Spur fortification at Edinburgh Castle.

== See also ==
- History of Scotland
- Scottish Reformation
