= Camillo Marini =

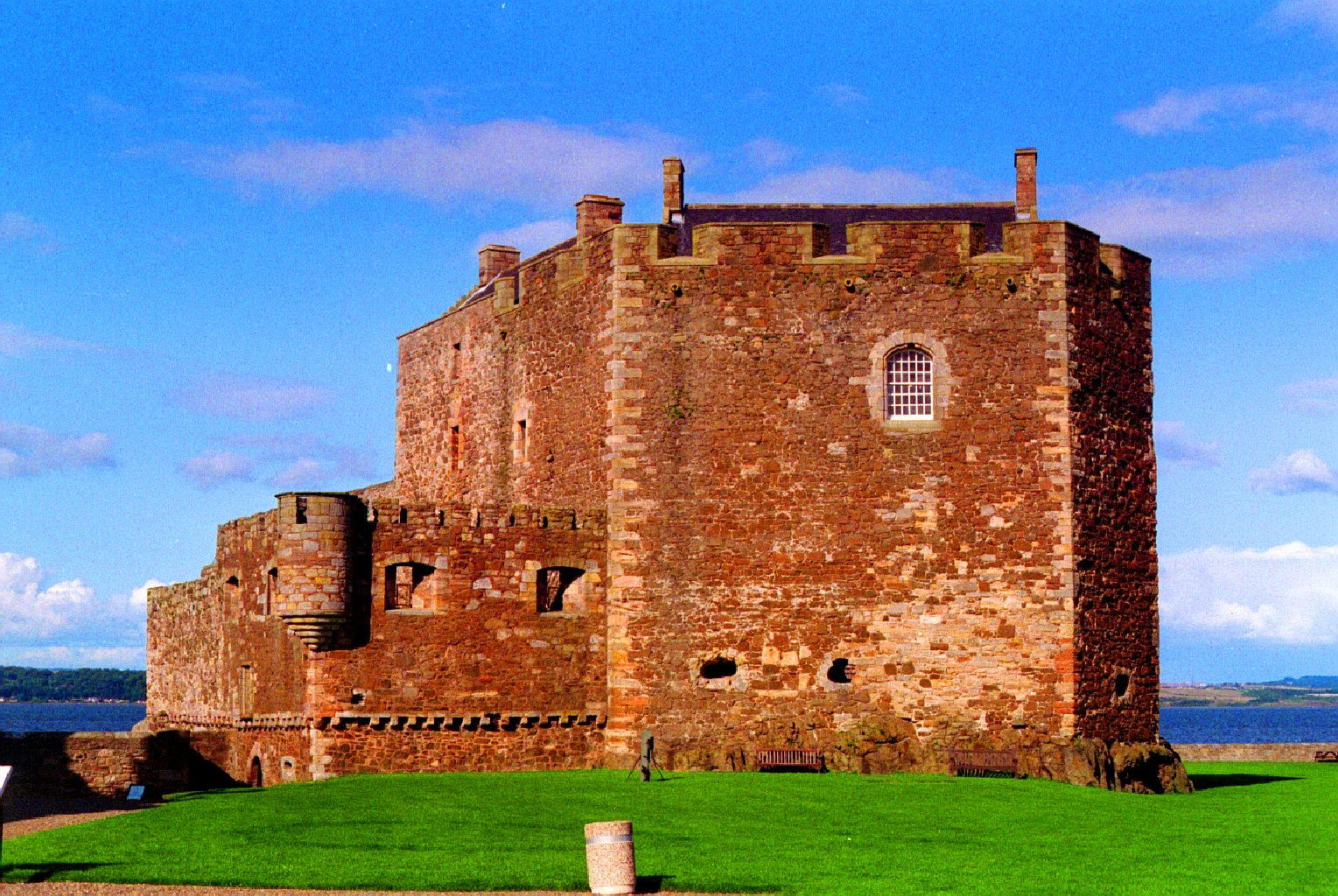
Blackness Castle

Camillo Marini (died 1552) was an Italian soldier and military engineer in French service.

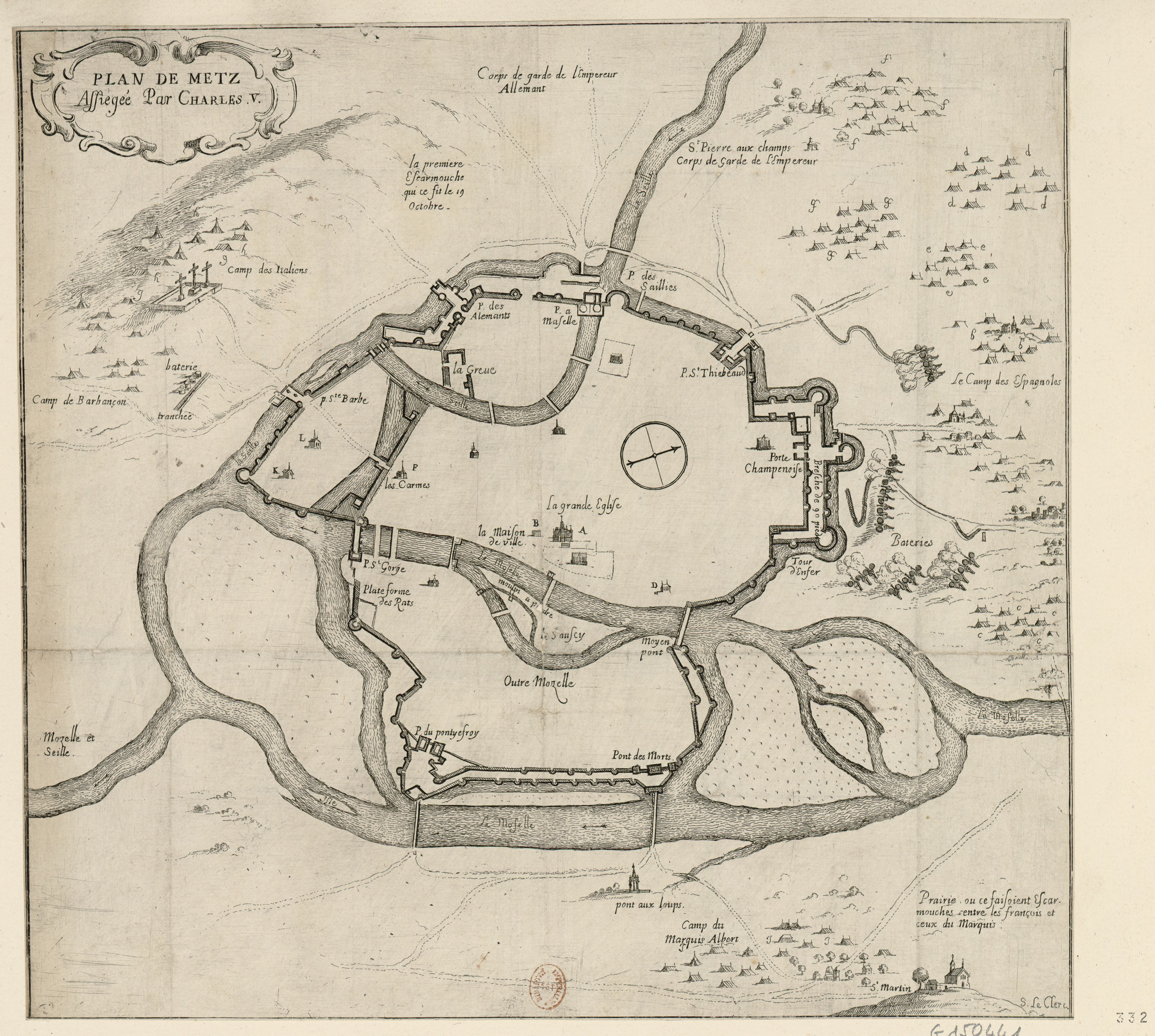
Plan of the Siege of Metz (1552)

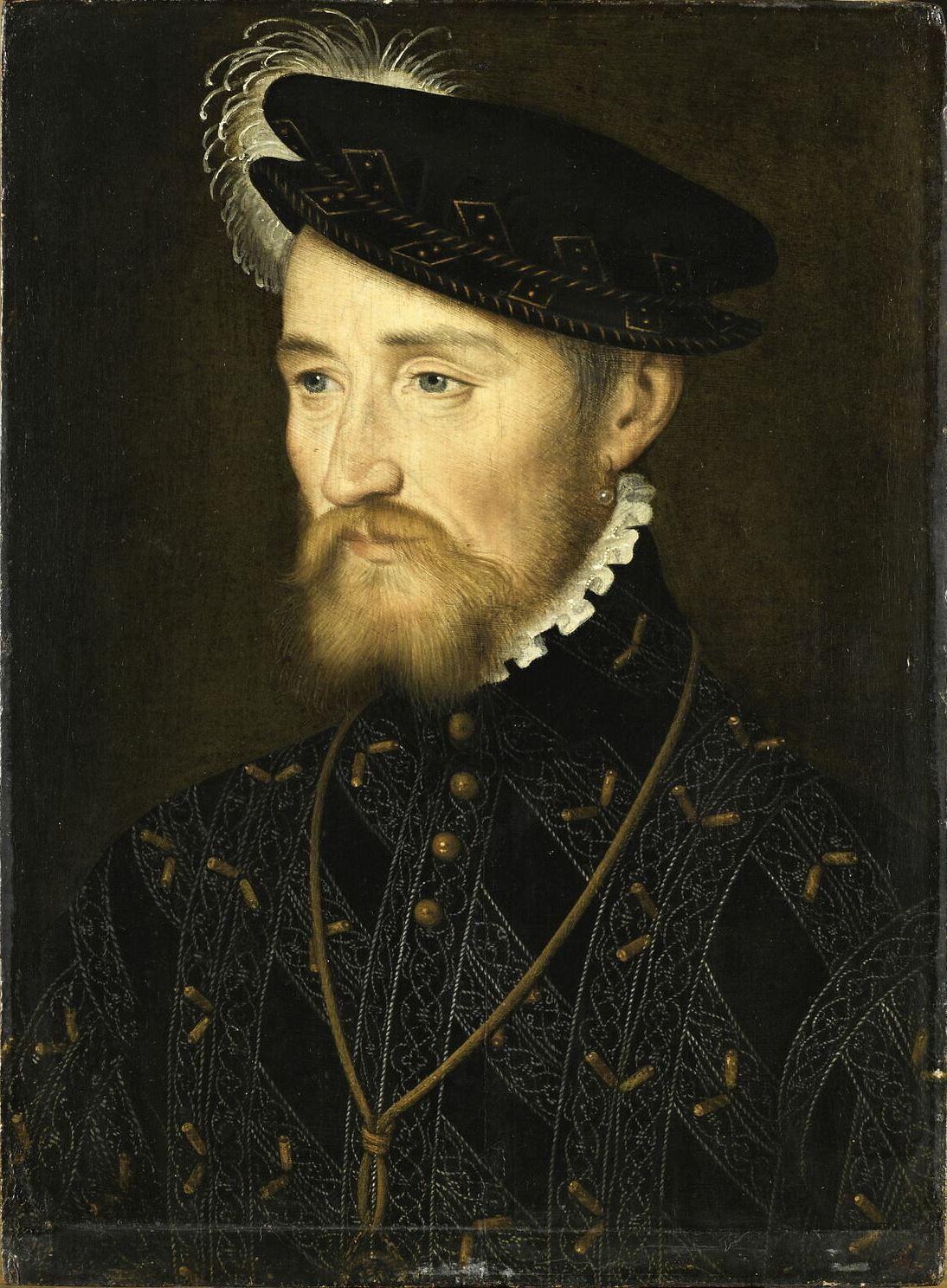
François, Duke of Guise

== Career ==
He was a brother of Girolamo Marini of Ancona or Montegibbio near Sassuolo (died 1553), who was also a military engineer. In French records he was often called "Camille Marin".

In April 1549, Camillo Marini was recommended to Henri II of France as a replacement for Migliorino Ubaldini and Jérome Mellorin in Scotland during the war now known as the "Rough Wooing" He had a salary of 100 francs a month, and after consultation between Mary of Guise and Paul de Thermes was appointed Captain of Blackness Castle. Blackness had become a storehouse for French munitions during the war.

Marini discussed border fortifications at Jedburgh, and at Eyemouth and probably Dunbar Castle in 1550 and 1551.

== Jedburgh ==
After the war with England had ended, Marini was at Jedburgh with Regent Arran during a justice court or ayre on 15 March 1551. He wrote a letter to Mary of Guise, who was in France. Henri II had sent 3,000 livres tournois or écu for repairs or building works. The French diplomat and soldier Henri Cleutin, who was also in Jedburgh, wanted new border fortifications. The location of the planned fort is not known for certain.

== Metz ==
Back in France in 1552, Marini served in the Italian War of 1551–1559. While making designs for fortifications at Verdun, Marini disagreed over details with the commander François de Scépeaux, sieur de Vieilleville. He worked with Piero Strozzi and Jean de Renaud de Saint-Rémy for François, Duke of Guise at the siege of Metz. They were tasked with reworking the old fortifications of the town to take artillery on new ramparts and platforms. At first it was hard to recruit enough labourers called "pioneers" because it was harvest season and the grape harvest was approaching. Poor women and boys of the town were set to work.

Marini was fatally wounded by a firearm shot on 5 December. According to Bertrand de Salignac, Marini was discussing the defences with the commander François, Duke of Guise. At a flanker at the base of the Tour D'Enfer (Torre dell' Inferno) at the western circuit of the city walls, the Duke looked at the enemy trenchwork through a gap between two wool sacks used to improvise the defences. When Marini looked out in the same place, he was shot in the head.
