= Alexander Crichton of Brunstane =

Scottish Protestant laird

Alexander Crichton of Brunstane (died before December 1558) was a Scottish Protestant laird who advocated the murder of Cardinal David Beaton and supported the plan for the marriage of Mary, Queen of Scots and Prince Edward of England. In contemporary letters and documents Alexander is known by variant spellings of "Brunstane," his territorial designation. The original House of Brunstane was near Penicuik, and another Crichton estate at Gilberstoun near Portobello, Edinburgh later became known as Brunstane.

== Career ==
=== Affair of the Cardinal's letters ===
Alexander Crichton went to France carrying royal letters in 1539 and as a servant of Cardinal Beaton. On his return in February 1540 his ship was forced by a storm to anchor in an English harbour. Subsequently, the English ambassador in Scotland Ralph Sadler tried to embarrass and discredit Cardinal Beaton in front of James V of Scotland with compromising letters captured from Brunstane's bag. James V however argued in favour of the Cardinal that he had a separate spiritual authority in Scotland apart from the King's own temporal powers. Later, when the Cardinal was present, James and Ralph compared the captured letters with Beaton's copies, and found a discrepancy. James V thanked Sadler and his uncle Henry VIII but would not find fault in the Cardinal's actions.

=== Messages to France ===
Alexander Crichton remained in the Cardinal's favour and sailed with him to France in 1540. He returned before his master in 1541 to meet James V. The King, Crichton, and the secretary, Thomas Erskine of Haltoun, played tennis at St Andrews on 3 April 1541. In November 1542 he sailed to France from Dumbarton on the business of rents owed to the Cardinal and Mary of Guise. He returned with money for James V from Francis I of France and was later accused of keeping some of it. An English spy said of Alexander's return in December 1542 that he had brought "little comfort." On 19 November 1542 he and his son John were rewarded for Alexander's services and expenses in France with a new charter for part of their Gilberstoun estate.

== War of the Rough Wooing ==
=== Assured Scot ===
After the death of James V in December 1542, Scotland was ruled by a Governor, Regent Arran. By now Alexander Crichton of Brunstane was receiving an English pension as a supporter of English political and Protestant religious policy in Scotland. In July 1543 Cardinal Beaton and his allies who opposed Regent Arran and pro-English initiatives camped with up to 6,000 armed men at Linlithgow, where Mary, Queen of Scots was kept in the Linlithgow Palace. Alexander Crichton told Ralph Sadler that the principal cause of this rebellion was to break the peace with England, the recently signed Treaty of Greenwich. This peace agreement provided that Mary, Queen of Scots would marry the English Prince Edward when she was of age. In his report to England, Sadler contrasted Crichton's and George Douglas's account of the situation with the statement of the Earl of Glencairn, that the rebel party were happy with the marriage plan and only concerned with the detail of when Mary would be sent to England.

The Governor and the Cardinal were reconciled. Crichton continued to correspond with Ralph Sadler. In November 1543, when Sadler had been forced to move from Edinburgh to Tantallon Castle and the English marriage plan was losing support in Scotland, Brunstane wrote that he was continuing to recruit supporters for English policy, and mentions John Charteris and John Sandilands of Calder. He persuaded Sandilands's neighbours to refuse offers of French payments.

=== Plots against the Cardinal ===
At the opening of the war of the Rough Wooing in March 1544, Brunstane met the English Berwick Pursuivant, Henry Ray secretly in Edinburgh and gave him letters he had written for Henry VIII. In April 1544, he proposed the murder of Cardinal Beaton, while Lord Hertford was planning the invasion that resulted in the burning of Edinburgh in May. The offer was not taken up, but Brunstane was given a cipher code to use in his English letters. Brunstane employed a Scot called Wishart to take his plan for the Cardinal to Lord Hertford on 17 April 1544, who noted for Henry VIII its two objectives;

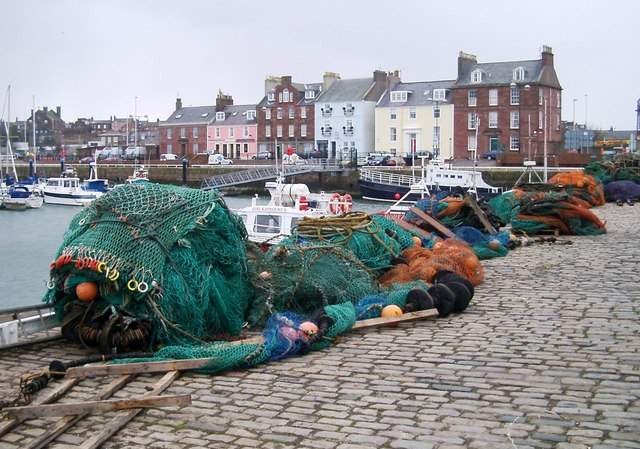
Alexander Crichton of Brunstane offered to raise Scottish troops and destroy Arbroath for Henry VIII

One is, that the Larde of Grange, late Tresourer of Scotlande, the Master of Rothes, th'earl of Rothers eldest son, and John Charters, wolde attempte eyther to apprehende or slee the Cardynall at some tyme when he shall passe thorough the Fyf lande, ...,
The other is, that in case Your Majestie would grant unto them a convenyent enterteynnment for to kepe 1,000 or 1,500 men in wages for a moneth or two, ..., they will take uppon them, at such tyme as Your Majesties armye shalbe in Scotland, to destroye the abbey and town of Arbroath ..., and t'apprehende all those whiche they say be the principall impugnators of amyte bitwen Englande and Scotlande"

One is, that the laird of Grange, lately Treasurer of Scotland, the Master of Rothes, the earl of Rothes's eldest son, and John Charteris, would attempt either to apprehend or slay the Cardinal at some time when he shall through Fife land.
The other is, that in case Your Majesty would grant them a convenient entertainment (finance) for 1,000 or 1,500 men in wages, they will undertake at such time as Your Majesties army shall be in Scotland, to destroy the Abbey and town of Arbroath, and apprehend all those which they say be the principal opponents of the amity between England and Scotland

The historian Charles Rogers discussed the identity of Brunstane's messenger "Wishart." Rogers argued that the priest and master of arts and Protestant preacher George Wishart would not simply be called "Wishart" in this correspondence, and suggested the messenger was a young man, John, eldest son of John Wishart of Carnbeg.

According to the report of Eustace Chapuys, Brunstane tried to speak to Lord Hertford at Leith on 5 May 1544 during his invasion of Edinburgh. One of Hertford's guards shot him in the leg with an arrow. He returned next day with papers of safe-conduct, saying he had offers from Scottish lords, but Hertford, who had orders not to negotiate with any Scot, would not see him. Hertford wrote that Crichton was in the field with Arran's forces and retreated with them to Linlithgow. Before the 15 May, Crichton had got a message Hertford mentioning that he planned to come to London as he could no longer abide in Scotland. He went to London in June 1544, carrying a letter to Henry VIII from George Douglas of Pittendreich.

Brunstane went back to London on Arran's business in November 1544 to discuss compensation for captured shipping. Brunstane repeated his offer to capture or kill the Cardinal in July 1545. Henry VIII would not directly sponsor the murder but Ralph Sadler wrote to Brunstane with the encouragement that it would be "an acceptable service to God to take him away." Sadler promised Henry VIII would reward the killers. He also suggested that George Douglas of Pittendreich and the Earl of Cassilis should become involved in Brunstane's plot, although nothing was done at this time.

=== International angles ===
The Governor of the Netherlands, Mary of Hungary believed that France insincerely encouraged the English marriage plan in order to gain an advantage in negotiations with England about Boulogne which had been captured on 13 September 1544. There was a third scheme. Brunstane wrote to Sadler on 20 October 1545 requesting an urgent meeting at Berwick upon Tweed. George Douglas of Pittendreich had told him that the Lords of the Parliament of Scotland had signed an agreement for Mary, Queen of Scots to marry James Hamilton, the son of the Governor. James Hamilton, the "Master of Hamilton," had been kept by the Cardinal at St Andrews Castle since October 1544. Alexander had heard that the Cardinal was trying to have the queen brought to St Andrews, but he was sceptical that the Cardinal really wanted the Hamilton marriage to proceed, and thought that Mary of Guise was pretending to be angry about the plan.

Sadler returned to London and the revelation of his wife's bigamy, and there is no record of a meeting with Brunstane at Berwick. The diplomat Johannes Sturm wrote to the English secretary of state, William Paget on 4 December with news of discussions of the new marriage plan in France. Sturmius realised that the Hamilton marriage would disrupt the Anglo-French peace treaty negotiations and advised Paget they should hinder it.

=== Wishart's arrest ===
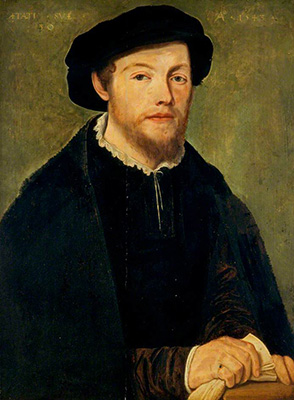
Alexander Crichton of Brunstane was with the preacher George Wishart when Arran's men came to arrest him.

In 1546 the preacher George Wishart stayed at the House of Brunstane. The Earl of Bothwell arrested Wishart at the house of Brunstane's friend, John Cockburn of Ormiston on 16 January 1546. Later that night Arran's men came for Ormiston, Brunstane and young Sandilands of Calder. Alexander escaped, running in the frost through Ormiston wood and on to Tantallon Castle. George Wishart was taken to St Andrews and executed. On 16 May 1546 a summons of treason was issued on Alexander. The Cardinal was murdered at St Andrews Castle by a group of Protestant lairds from Fife which included the men Alexander had put forward. These lairds, who became known as the Castilians, garrisoned the castle and held the Governor's son, James Hamilton hostage.

=== The Scottish ratification of the Treaty of Ardres ===
The long-awaited Anglo-French Treaty of Ardres (or Campe) was concluded on 7 June 1546, and required a ratification from Scotland to be finalised. Although the Scottish Parliament had continued to summon Alexander Crichton for treason, the action was abandoned for unspecified reasons on 4 August. The Scottish Parliament approved the ratification of the Treaty of Ardres on 14 August 1546. As the factional rivalry between the Governor and Mary of Guise continued, there was controversy over who should carry Scotland's ratification to London. Adam Otterburn wrote to Mary of Guise with news that Lord Ruthven, the secretary David Paniter, and Arran's half-brother, the Abbot of Paisley accompanied by Alexander Crichton of Brunstane had set out, but they were recalled after a change of plan.

The Spanish Empire pressed for the ratification, as Scottish captains were able to harass Flemish shipping without redress. Finally, Henry's Welsh diplomat Edward Carne was able to show the Scottish ratification to Mary of Hungary's administrator in Brussels, the President Lodewijk van Schore on 10 September. Schore pointed out its shortcomings and noted that Arran laid siege to St Andrews Castle. Mary of Hungary understood that the Empire remained at war with Scotland despite the treaty. She believed Arran's government delayed the resolution of peace with the empire because the situation prevented Henry sending military aid to the Protestants in St Andrews Castle.

=== Brunstane declares for England ===
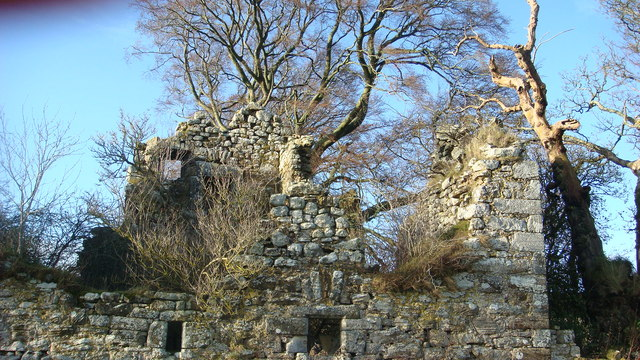
Brunstane Castle near Penicuik

The English Privy Council authorised payments to Brunstane in 1546, one in April for three months wages for a band of 100 horsemen, and in October granted his servant Cockburn a passport to carry satin cloth over the border for his furniture. The English border warden William Eure had already given him money. He was an "Assured Scot".

After the battle of Pinkie on 10 September 1547, Brunstane travelled with the English Norroy Herald, Gilbert Dethick, carrying messages between the Privy Council of Scotland and Mary of Guise at Stirling Castle and Lord Hertford. The English commander Grey of Wilton occupied Haddington, and garrisoned nearby lairds's houses in East Lothian. Alexander and John Cockburn held the Houses of Ormiston, Saltoun, and Brunstane for England.

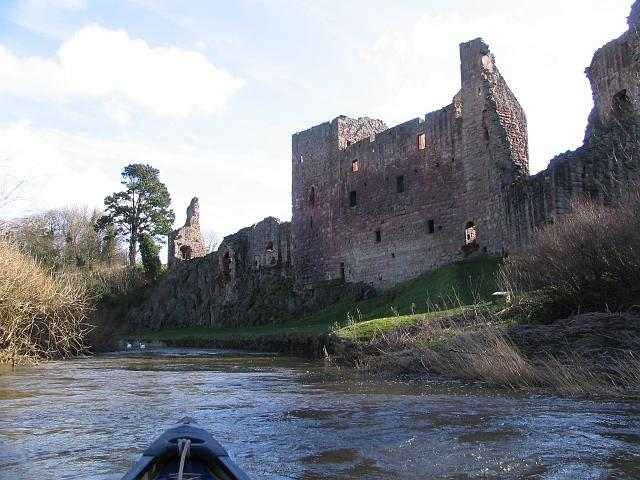
Alexander Crichton of Brunstane planned to capture the Earl of Bothwell's castle at Hailes

Alexander and Ormiston waited for their opportunity to capture Edinburgh Castle and deliver to the English the Governor of Scotland Regent Arran and his half-brother John Hamilton, who had displaced Alexander's kinsman Robert Crichton as Bishop of Dunkeld. They also wanted Grey of Wilton to capture and garrison the Earl of Bothwell's house at Hailes Castle. They wrote jointly to John Luttrell, the English commander of Broughty Castle on 17 January 1548 asking him to allow fishermen from Crail to supply them.

=== "Yon new blockhouse" ===
Regent Arran brought four cannon from Edinburgh Castle at the end of February and captured the houses of the three Lothian lairds. The lairds of Brunstane and Ormiston were declared traitors and the Scottish Privy Council ordered the demolition of Brunstane, Gilberstoun, and Ormiston. In March 1548, slaters were employed to take the roof off Brunstane House, and the roof timbers were dismantled and taken to Edinburgh. The woods were harvested and the workmen were protected by 10 gunners armed with culverins. The timber and stone from the house was used in the construction of the new Spur fortification at Edinburgh Castle designed by Migliorino Ubaldini, which Ormiston's brother, Ninian Cockburn, called "yon neu blok hous." Goods were also seized from Alexander's house at Penicuik. On 6 April, Grey of Wilton reported that Alexander's house had not been burnt, but;

"Marry! the topp is pulled downe, so much of the stone as was lyked, which laye in redyness to bylde, caryed to Edynborough, his yong trees cut up, and all worse handled than if it had been with fyer."

Alexander stayed at Nunraw, he, Ormiston and their ally, Hugh Douglas of Longniddry, remained in Lothian with a force of 150 English horsemen. Grey of Wilton told Brunstane and Ormiston that he hoped to capture George Douglas, and they kept his secret. Following Grey of Wilton's recommendation, Edward VI gave the two lairds compensation for their losses caused by military action and supplying Haddington which was held by the English.

== Heir restored ==
Alexander was forfeited as a traitor by the Parliament of Scotland on 14 December 1548, for his crimes in January of assisting Grey of Wilton, keeping the House of Saltoun, and persuading lieges of Scotland to form leagues against Mary, Queen of Scots. After his death, the date of which has not been established, on 5 December 1558, the forfeiture was reversed in favour of his heir, John Crichton, on the grounds that the procedure was flawed because Alexander was out of the country at the time. The sentence against John Cockburn of Ormiston was withdrawn in the same terms on the same day.

John Crichton was an active supporter of the Lords of the Congregation during the Scottish Reformation. Like his father before him, he was called the "Laird of Brymston" (Brunstane) in English letters. On 23 January 1560 he rode into Scotland to Glasgow at night bringing letters from the English court to the Protestants and was sent to Fife to summon the lords to come for the negotiation of the treaty of Berwick. John Crichton rebuilt Brunstane Castle at Penicuik in 1568 and the date was carved over the entrance.
