= Migliorino Ubaldini =

Italian military engineer

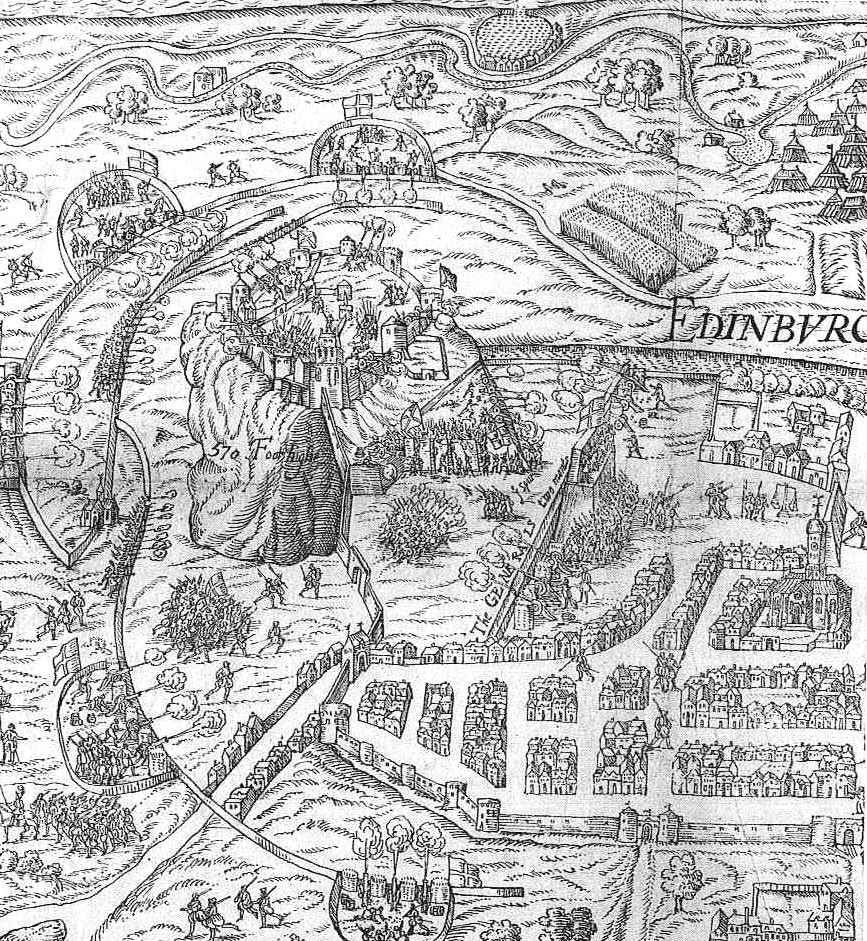
Woodcut of Edinburgh in 1573, showing Ubaldini's Spur

Ubaldini Migliorino (active 1548), known also as "Captain Mellerin," was an Italian military engineer working in Scotland. He designed new fortifications at the entrances of Edinburgh Castle, Dunbar Castle, and possibly the walled town of Leith.

== Scottish assignment ==
During the war with England known as the Rough Wooing, on 5 February 1548 Regent Arran appointed Migliorino Ubaldini as supreme commander of all Scottish forces by land and sea. Ubaldini had been sent to Scotland by Henry II of France who called him a famous captain. Despite this, Marcus Merriman, a modern historian, found no recorded details of his previous career. Merriman linked Ubaldini's appointment in Scotland with Lord Methven's plea to Mary of Guise in December 1547 for a French captain who had intelligence to assiege and order artillery.

Two letters written by Ubaldini in 1548 to Mary of Guise survive. In 1548/9 he wrote two letters to the brother of Mary of Guise, the Duc d'Aumale, which note a French form of his name as; "Captain Mellerin." Ulbaldini and Piero Strozzi directed a refortification of Dunbar Castle in September 1548.

At the same period, there was another Ubaldini in Scotland; Petruccio Ubaldini, who fought for English at Haddington. Other Italian engineers who worked in Scotland for the Scottish side during the Rough Wooings include Leone Strozzi, Piero Strozzi, and perhaps Giovanni Portinari, who Nicolas Throckmorton later recruited for English service because he already spoke Scots. Portinari certainly visited Scotland in English service to observe and draw fortifications at the siege of Leith.

Camillo Marini (died 1552), younger brother of Girolamo Marini, was a replacement for Ubaldini in Scotland. He was appointed Captain of Blackness Castle, and worked on border fortifications at Jedburgh, and at Eyemouth and probably Dunbar Castle in 1550 and 1551. Lorenzo Pomarelli worked for Mary of Guise for six years 1554 - 1560.

== Fort of the castle hill ==
Master John Hamilton of Milnburn began building a rampart and blockhouse in February 1547, recorded as casting the "foussys" or ditches on Castle Hill, and reported by James Stewart of Cardonald.

While the English were fortifying Haddington, in March 1548 Ubaldini was working to strengthen Edinburgh Castle. A lodging was found in the Royal Mile for the "Italiane devisar of the forte of the castle hill"." Ubaldini commenced the construction of a renaissance style trace italienne fortification in front of the castle on the present esplanade. Some of the timber and stone used was obtained from the woods and house of Alexander Crichton of Brunstane who had sided with England. His friend and ally Ninian Cockburn vowed the new work would never be finished, writing, "yon neu blak hous quhilk will nocht cum abof the erde."

An account for building the new fort at Edinburgh Castle from January 1547 to 19 July 1550 amounts to £6,377 Scots. There had been a French contribution of at least £4070 Scots for the work.

The triangular blockhouse became known as the Spur. The Imperial envoy Mathieu Strick noted in July 1551 that the completed Spur was decorated with the arms of France. Ubaldini went on to design works at Dunbar Castle in September which were demolished in 1567, and perhaps at Stirling Castle where there are remains of a similar work, called the 'French Spur,' with carved French insignia.

Mary of Guise strengthened the Spur in April 1560 with "a flank to be made on the side of the gate de l’Esperon." She held a parley at the "fore blockhouse at the first gate of the castle" before the commencement of the siege of Leith with the English commander James Croft. According to John Knox she watched the fighting at Leith from the "foir wall" of the Castle on 7 May 1560 and commented that the bodies of English soldiers on the walls of Leith were the "fairest tapestry that ever I saw".

== Thomas Fisher's description of the Spur and the bulwarks at Leith ==
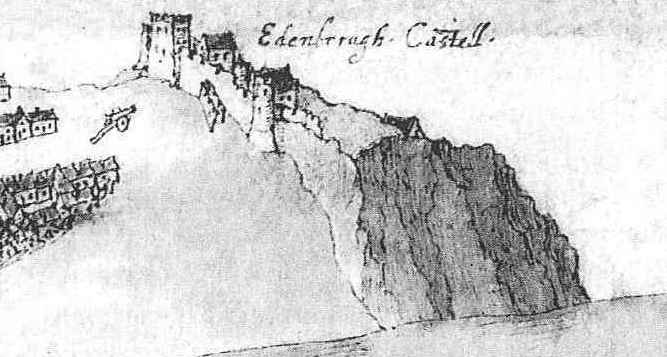
Sketch showing Edinburgh Castle in 1544, with Christopher Morris's siege gun placed at the site of the Spur

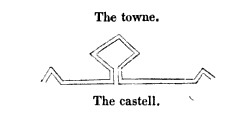
Thomas Fisher's Sketch of the Spur, from British Library Cotton Caligula B/VII f.336.

The English soldier Thomas Fisher described two bulwarks added to the fortification of Leith in a letter to the Duke of Somerset, 12 October 1548. Fisher passed on observations made by an English prisoner, the soldier Thomas Carlile, who had garrisoned Byllye Tower in January 1548, but was captured at the siege of Haddington. Thomas Carlile saw the new works at Kirkgate and by the sea, and described the new Spur at Edinburgh Castle made by the Engineer who "came out of France". The Spur occupied the place where Christopher Morris had placed a cannon in 1544. Thomas Fisher included a sketch of the spur in his letter, "grocely pricked out." It is unclear if Fisher attributes the work at Leith to Ubaldini: the fortifications there were completed by his successor Piero Strozzi;

"Lastely he (Thomas Carlile) saith, that having had libertie to walke abrode in the towne of Edenbrughe with his taker, and somtymes between that and Leghe, he telleth that Leghe is entrenched round aboute, and that, besides a bulwarke made by the haven side towardes the sea on the ground where the Chapell stode, which I suppose your Grace remembreth, there is an other greater bulwerk made on the mayne ground at the gret churche standinge at the upper end of the towne, towardes Edenbrughe.
And that their engener having at the firste comyng of the Frenche, devised a traves walle, between the towne of Edenbrugh and the castell, the same, saith he, is already a good piece builded and rysen brest highe of a man, at the charges [of] the Governor, which wall, with a poynted bulwerk in the myddes, ronneth by the jugement of his eyes to'whart the grene where Sir Christopher Morres planted th'ordenance at your Graces first approche there, in sorte here under grocely pricked out, and at the south end thereof is th'entreet her unto, which distaunce seameth to be like a base court to the castell."

== The spur and the Marian civil war ==
During the Marian Civil War the castle was held by William Kirkcaldy of Grange for Mary, Queen of Scots. He modified and strengthened the spur. Workers were reinforcing the spur in April 1571 with earth in baskets called "gabions" when a man fell to his death. The spur was described by Rowland Johnson, Surveyor of Berwick who came to assist the siege of Edinburgh Castle on 26 January 1573 during civil war in Scotland;

"we fynd upon the said este syde a spurre lyke a bulwarke standing befor the foot of the rocke, which spurre enclosethe that syde flanked out one bothe sydes; on the sowthe syde is the gaite wher they enter the castle. Which spur is like 20 foote high vamured with turf and basketes set and furnished with ordinance."

The spur was repaired and improved by the end of March 1573, and these works were described by Johnson's colleague Nicolas Errington, who saw that the spur had been reinforced and filled with earth, and the tip or fore part cut back and rebuilt in masonry. A woodcut illustration of the spur appeared in Holinshed's Chronicle depicting the 1573 siege which may derive from a drawing made by Johnson. The Earl of Leicester mentioned the spur in news of the final days of the siege in May:

Uppon Thursday last a tower, called Davy's Tower, the chief of the castle, was battered down almost flatt, with certain other smaller towrs, so that these place were ready saltable, and the bray at the gate, which some call the Spurr, was also the same day taken.

The Spur was finally demolished in 1650, and the stones were taken for the use of John Milne for the town's building work at the Parliament House and the Citadel and fortifications at Leith. It was planned to erect the gate arch at the Parliament.
