= Ormiston Castle =

Tower house in East Lothian, Scotland

Coordinates: 55.8989°N 2.9415°W

Ormiston Castle is a ruined 16th-century tower house, about 4 miles (6.4 km) east of Dalkeith, East Lothian, Scotland, and north of Ormiston Mains.

It was formerly known as the "House of Ormiston" and is known alternatively as Old Ormiston.

There was also a tower house called Ormiston near Innerleithen, and one called Ormiston Tower near Kelso, both in Scottish Borders.

== History ==
The Lindsays first owned the property. The Coburns acquired the property in the 14th century. The English occupied the castle in 1547 as John Cockburn of Ormiston had sided with them in the Rough Wooing. In revenge James Hamilton, Duke of Châtellerault, the regent brought cannon and retook the castle in February 1548 and burnt it. John Hope, 2nd Earl of Hopetoun purchased the property in 1748.

George Wishart, the Protestant martyr was taken from the castle by the Earl of Bothwell to St Andrews, where Cardinal Beaton had him executed. Alexander Crichton of Brunstane evaded Bothwell's men, running in the night through Ormiston wood and on to Tantallon Castle.

== Structure ==
The castle was built on a high ridge, with the river valley on one side and possibly ditches on the other three sides. There was an L-plan keep, to which a 16th-century lean-to was added, enclosed by a barmkin wall with a gatehouse, which probably faced east.

== See also ==
- Castles in Great Britain and Ireland
- List of castles in Scotland
