= George Douglas of Pittendreich =

Scottish peer (died 1552)

George Douglas of Pittendreich (died 1552) was a member of the powerful Red Douglas family of Scotland, who struggled for control of the young King James V in 1528. His second son became James Douglas, 4th Earl of Morton and Regent of Scotland. Initially, George Douglas promoted the marriage of Mary, Queen of Scots and Prince Edward of England. After war was declared between England and Scotland he worked for peace and to increase the power of Mary of Guise, the widow of James V.

Arms of George Douglas of Pittendreich

== Family ==
George Douglas was the brother of Archibald Douglas, 6th Earl of Angus, and so was called "Master of Angus" in his lifetime. His parents were George Douglas, Master of Angus, and Elizabeth Drummond, daughter of John Drummond, 1st Lord Drummond. George married Elizabeth Douglas, the daughter and heir of David Douglas of Pittendreich near Elgin.

The Douglas family gained custody of the young James V in 1526. After the king escaped from them he laid siege to Tantallon Castle in 1529. Douglas family members and allies including Alexander Drummond were forfeited of their lands and titles by the Parliament of Scotland. When the family was re-instated in 1543, George Douglas was the legal representative of the Earl of Morton whose lands had been had forfeited. When the Morton lands were restored, George Douglas had his son James, the future Regent, married to Morton's youngest daughter, Elizabeth Douglas. The 3rd Earl of Morton's eldest daughter Margaret married James Hamilton, 2nd Earl of Arran and another daughter married Lord Maxwell. Sadly, these three sisters were all affected by mental ill-health.

George's eldest son David Douglas, who became the 7th Earl of Angus, married Margaret Hamilton, the daughter of John Hamilton of Samuelston, a brother of Regent Arran. Arran gave them a dowry of £1000 from the royal exchequer in November 1552.

George had a son, George, and two daughters, Elizabeth and Margaret, outside his marriage. The son married Marioun Douglas heiress of Parkhead or Parkheid, and so became known as George Douglas of Parkhead and was later Provost of Edinburgh and keeper of Edinburgh Castle. His daughter by Lady Dundas, Elizabeth, married Smeton Richeson. Margaret Douglas, who was born in Berwick, married a son of John Selby of Branxton.

== In the King's minority ==
In 1515 George Douglas defended Stirling Castle for Margaret Tudor to try to prevent Regent Albany gaining control of James V, but abandoned the castle.

He was imprisoned in Edinburgh Castle and then Dalkeith Palace and then Blackness Castle, in the keeping of Patrick Hamilton of Kincavil, in 1517, for fear of the Douglas family kidnapping the king.

In August 1526, the Earl of Lennox tried to abduct James V from the Palace of Holyroodhouse. The Douglases transferred the King to the house of the Archbishop of St Andrews in the Cowgate of Edinburgh, where George Douglas could keep a more secure watch with 40 men.

When Lennox and Angus joined in battle 2 miles west of Linlithgow on 4 September 1526, George Douglas was sent to bring a force raised in Edinburgh and the young King. The King tried to delay George, and at Corstorphine, close to Edinburgh, George raised his voice to James V and threatened him.

In May 1528, James V escaped from the Douglases, and George's custody, to his mother at Stirling Castle. According to Scottish chronicle historians, including Robert Lindsay of Pitscottie, James escaped from Falkland Palace at night. In Pitscottie's story, when George Douglas discovered the King had gone, he first rode towards Ballinbreich Castle, but learned from the Earl of Rothes that the king was not there. George returned to Falkland, and the Earl of Angus, George and his brother Archibald rode to Stirling. They learnt that James had declared them excluded from six miles of his presence. Subsequently, the family were forfeited by the Parliament of Scotland, and although James's siege of their castle of Tantallon was unsuccessful, they went into exile in England.

== Working for peace and the English marriage ==
=== Reports of Solway Moss ===
A letter written by George Douglas is the earliest source of the story that James V made Oliver Sinclair of Pitcairn commander of his army before the battle of Solway Moss. The story was doubted by the modern historian Jamie Cameron who points out that the exile George Douglas had much to gain by fabricating such an incident. After the death of James V, George Douglas and his brother the Earl returned to Scotland in January 1543, in the company of a number of Lords taken prisoner at Solway Moss. Viscount Lisle, the Lord Warden of the Border, heard that George was welcomed in Scotland, and stayed with Arran till midnight on 15 January 1543 at Holyroodhouse. The next day he met Cardinal David Beaton and they embraced. Arran declared that the Douglases would be restored to their lands.

=== Towards the treaty of Greenwich ===
On 18 March 1543, George made a contract with James Douglas, 3rd Earl of Morton; he would pay the Earl £2000, he would help Morton recover the lands he had resigned (under duress) to James V, and George's son James, the future Regent, would marry the Earl's daughter Elizabeth.

At first George was in favour of the marriage of Mary, Queen of Scots to Prince Edward of England. He was in London briefly in April 1543 as a representative of the Parliament of Scotland. The family historian David Hume of Godscroft records an anecdote that George Douglas is used to build consensus for the English marriage. In this tale a physician at court accepted the impossible task of teaching a donkey to speak. Other doctors had failed and been executed. This physician accepted telling the king it would take ten years and be very expensive. His friends asked why he had done this, and his answer was, – in ten years, I, the donkey or the king might be dead, and in the meantime I have had my wage. George was supposed to have argued that Mary's marriage was like this, the English threat was already present, but it would be years before she was of age and the marriage concluded.

Mary of Guise, the mother of Mary, Queen of Scots, was another power in Scotland, and she told the English diplomat Ralph Sadler that George Douglas "was as wily and crafty a man as any was in all Scotland". Regent Arran said much the same of her, and George Douglas said the same of Cardinal Beaton, and Sadler noted these conversations the best he could and sent them to Henry VIII.

A diplomatic mission to England was planned to finalise detail of the marriage treaty. Ralph Sadler described his early morning meeting with George Douglas on 1 May 1543 in a letter to Henry VIII. Douglas told him that the Scottish clergy were working against Henry's plans to preserve their "pomp and glory". Regent Arran was still minded to come an agreement with Henry VIII, and a council of the nobility had decided to send him and Lord Maxwell to London as ambassadors with their conclusions. George asked Sadler's advice about this mission. George thought Henry VIII would pleased to accept Arran's son James Hamilton as a hostage for the eventual delivery of Mary, Queen of Scots, to England, because if the queen the died, young Hamilton was heir to the throne of Scotland, and he should marry Princess Elizabeth. In the meantime, Henry VIII could appoint English and Scottish servants to serve Mary in Scotland, (Sadler later recommended Catherine Lady Edgecumbe, the widow of Peter Edgecumbe of Cotehele). Douglas offered the Sadler the insight that the Earl of Lennox and the clergy would form a faction or party against Regent Arran, and this would inevitably force him further into Henry's pocket to "work him at his will". He would also be offer Henry his advice on how to best invade Scotland, "I may nevertheless confer with his Highness upon the estate of this country, and say my poor mind how the same is to be conquered by force". Douglas told Sadler he would prefer the Earl of Glencairn as a companion diplomat than Maxwell, and on this point he got his way. Sadler noted for Henry that Douglas and Glencairn were friends to each other and wise men, "and if they be not true men, and assured to your majesty, then is no Scottish-man to be trusted."

George and the Earl of Glencairn went to meet Henry VIII at Hampton Court on 20 May 1543; George stayed only for a few days. Eustace Chapuys noted he was expected to return with favourable news for Henry. Thomas Wriothesley helped draft the proposals George carried back to Scotland. Mary would be sent to England at the age of 8 or at most 10 years old, and marry Edward when she was twelve. George arrived back in Edinburgh on 29 May and Ralph Sadler said he presented the English articles on 4 June.

On 1 July George was back in London as a commissioner completing the Treaty of Greenwich which was intended to bring peace between England and Scotland and secure the royal marriage plan. George then attempted to reconcile Arran and Cardinal David Beaton who was opposed to the marriage. Before the ratification of the treaty by the Scottish lords on 25 August, George held a meeting with the Cardinal at St Andrews Castle on 15 August 1543 assisted by the Earl Marischal and James Kirkcaldy of Grange. The Cardinal gave Regent Arran the Lord Seton as a hostage for George's safety. George told Sadler after the meeting that the Cardinal was compliant and wished only to obtain Henry's and Arran's favour but feared the Scottish abbeys would be suppressed. Cardinal Beaton refused to come to the ratification on account of the feelings of his party and the personal malice of Arran's wife, Margaret Douglas. (She was the eldest daughter of the 3rd Earl of Morton.) The ratification was delayed but George's negotiation at St. Andrews prevented armed conflict. Despite George's efforts, Regent Arran and the Scottish Parliament rejected the Treaty of Greenwich in December 1543, resulting in the war of the Rough Wooing.

=== The Rough Wooing ===
After the first English raids of 1544 there were moves to depose Arran as regent and give the role to Mary of Guise. George and the Earl of Angus were among her supporters and were imprisoned in Blackness Castle. Edward Seymour, Lord Hertford landed an army at Leith on 3 May 1544 which burnt Edinburgh, and Arran released the brothers, who made a bond with him to support the French marriage plan.

In June George sent the Scottish Rothesay Herald to Guise to take her letters to London and advised her to tell Francis I of France to deal only with her, not with Arran. George spent a night at Redhall near Edinburgh with Adam Otterburn and explained his thinking to him. In September, Guise gave him a pension and he wrote to her that; "if there were but two men in Scotland that will bide at your opinion I shall be one." On 18 October George wrote to Guise from Tantallon saying he would bring armed men to Stirling, promising, to fight Arran or besiege him in the castle;

"We sall fors the gufurnor and his part-takaris to come furth to the feilddis and fecht with us, or ellis we sall hungar tham to deith."

We shall force the Governor and his part-takers to come forth into the field and fight with us, or else we shall starve them to death.

It is not known if George defied Arran at Stirling. The brothers were duly summoned for treason by Arran's parliament of 6 November 1544. The issues were quickly reconciled, and the Douglas brothers were pardoned by a parliament on 12 December 1544 for recent and previous treasons before 1542. In February 1545, George sent a letter to Henry VIII, to be forwarded by his English contact Ralph Eure, (who was killed at the battle of Ancrum Moor). George wrote that the war was losing Henry's support in Scotland and offered advice;

"the Scots are informed that you would make gentlemen no better than shepherds, and by reason of the extreme war that uses killing women and young children and Scots prisoners that come forth of England, gentlemen say that Your Majesty will have a plane conquest of this realm, and that you will kill men women and children. This bruit (rumour) puts a great fear in the peoples's hearts and turns their hearts clearly from you: but gentle handling and good words will turn the favour of the people which may be a great help to Your Majesty's affairs."

=== A lost opportunity before the Battle of Pinkie ===
A month before the battle of Pinkie, on 9 August 1547 the Earl of Hertford, now Duke of Somerset, Lord Protector of England, told the Scottish ambassador Adam Otterburn that if George Douglas would negotiate at Newcastle-upon-Tyne he might not invade Scotland. Otterburn advised Arran to allow Douglas to negotiate, writing that he would work for the commonwealth of both realms and to avoid the shedding of Christian blood. Arran objected to this diplomacy, and wished others apart from Douglas might meet at Newcastle. There was no further meeting and the Scottish army was defeated by the English invasion force at Pinkie Cleugh near Musselburgh on 10 September 1547. David Hume of Godscroft relates that Angus and Sir George were at the battle on horseback marshalling the Scottish forces.

=== Struggle at Dalkeith ===
In 1548, George Douglas maintained communication with an English commander, William Grey of Wilton who made him captain of Yester Castle and Dalkeith. However, realising that Pittendreich was now on the side of the Regent, Wilton sent James Wilford and Thomas Wyndham to trap George at Dalkeith Palace. Dalkeith was taken on 3 June 1548 after a battle in front of the castle. George escaped, but his son James, Master of Morton, was captured, "sore hurt in the thigh." His wife Elizabeth Douglas was taken too, but Grey of Wilton released her on her promise she would convert her husband back to the English cause. George's former allies, the East Lothian lairds John Cockburn of Ormiston and Alexander Crichton of Brunstane had assisted Grey, who also commended "Newton the Scot" who fought for him at Dalkeith.

=== Working for Mary of Guise ===
In July 1548 one of George's servants was given £45 to gain intelligence in England. The money was to cover his expenses and the cost of messengers on his covert mission. In September 1549, the English soldier Thomas Holcroft hoped to organise the capture of George Douglas and facilitate the release of the St Andrew's castle Castilians who were prisoners in France.

George Douglas died in 1552, in the north of Scotland, while serving Mary of Guise.
