= John Cockburn of Ormiston =

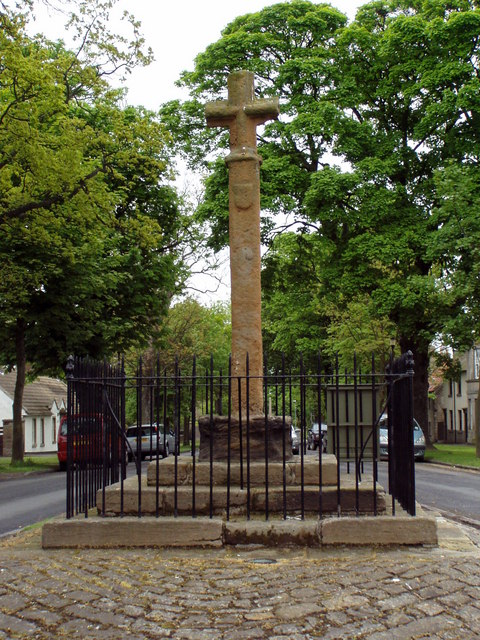
Mercat cross at Ormiston

John Cockburn, (d. 1583) laird of Ormiston, East Lothian, Scotland, was an early supporter of the Scottish Reformation. He was the eldest son of William Cockburn of Ormiston and Janet Somerville. John was usually called "Ormiston." During his lifetime there was also a laird of Ormiston in Teviotdale near Eckford, an ally of the rival Hepburn family.

== A Scottish Protestant in the Rough Wooing ==
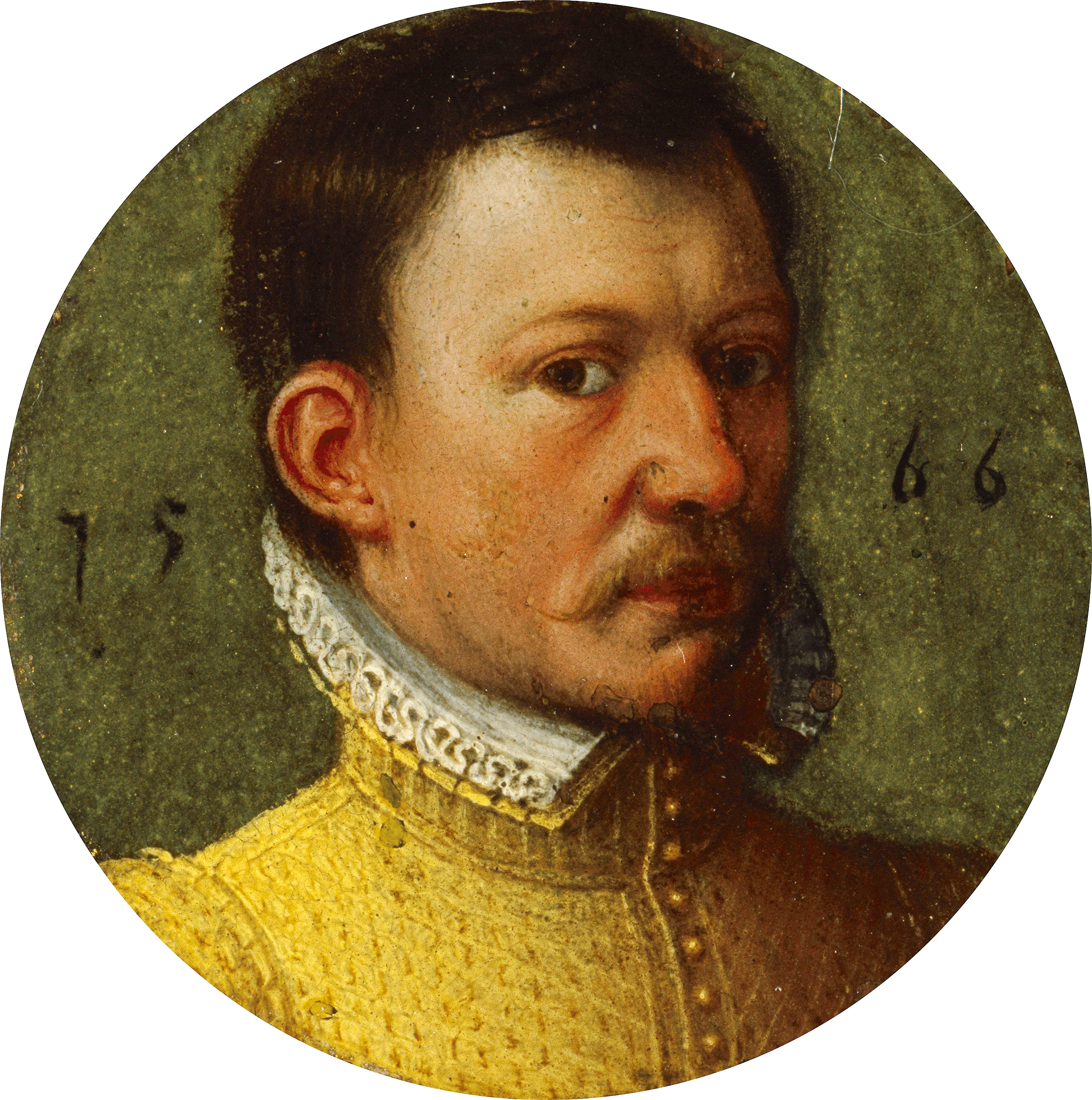
John Cockburn's powerful neighbour and enemy, the Earl of Bothwell

John Cockburn was a prominent Protestant and also on good terms with England, having a licence to trade there during the war of the Rough Wooing. He was pardoned for communing with the English during Lord Hertford's expedition in 1544. John Knox was tutor to one of his sons, and the Protestant preacher and martyr George Wishart was arrested by James Hepburn, 4th Earl of Bothwell, the Sheriff of Haddingtonshire, at his House of Ormiston on 16 January 1546. After negotiation Bothwell took Wishart away to nearby Elphinstone Castle. Soon after on the same night, soldiers of the Governor of Scotland, Regent Arran, arrived to arrest John, his nephew Sandilands of Calder, and Alexander Crichton of Brunstane. Brunstane escaped but his two companions were imprisoned at Edinburgh Castle. John escaped from the castle one morning by going over the wall.

John, and his younger brother Ninian Cockburn were amongst those accused of the murder of Cardinal David Beaton in 1546. Cockburn welcomed the prospect of an English invasion of Scotland that would help Scottish supporters of church reform. In September 1547 he is said to have guided the English army through the Lammermuirs to the battle of Pinkie. In January 1548, William Patten published the names of John Cockburn and 36 other Scottish lairds and gentleman who had sworn an oath on 23 September 1547 to be loyal to Edward VI of England as "Assured Scots".

John and Alexander Crichton of Brunstane tried to hold three houses on behalf of Grey of Wilton, who occupied Haddington. Ormiston and Brunstane waited for an opportunity to capture Edinburgh Castle and deliver Regent Arran and the Bishop of Dunkeld to the English. They also wanted Grey of Wilton to capture and garrison the Earl of Bothwell's house at Hailes Castle. They wrote jointly to John Luttrell, the English commander of Broughty Castle on 17 January 1548 asking him to allow fishermen from Crail to supply them. The Governor of Scotland, Regent Arran captured the House of Ormiston.

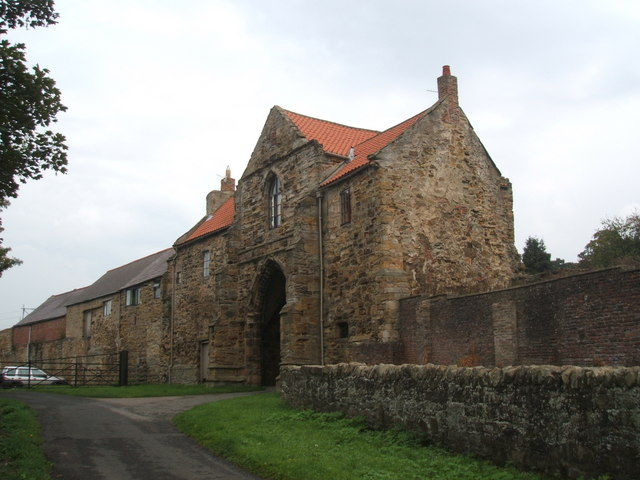
Gatehouse of the Kepier Hospital in Durham given to John Cockburn by Edward VI

John tried to defend the House of Saltoun but his men were inadequately armed. At the end of February 1548 Arran brought four cannon to Saltoun; three cut-throats mounted on carts, and a single-falcon. Five of Cockburn's men were killed in the fight, and five were captured and hanged. The Privy Council of Scotland declared him a traitor on 29 February 1548 and ordered the demolition of Ormiston House.

John and Crichton of Brunstane went into exile in England. On 25 March 1548, the English Privy Council gave him £65 as the King's reward for the losses in Scotland. Edward VI sent John a letter reassuring him of his goodwill in March 1550, as peace was declared between Scotland and England. For his services to the Protestant cause, on 13 March 1552, Edward VI rewarded John Cockburn with the lands and income belonging to the Hospital of St Giles in Durham known as the Kepier Hospital. John sold all these lands to the Heath family by 1564.

== Arrested on the border ==
John must have found the Catholic regime of Mary I less congenial, and in April 1555 he tried to return to Scotland without a passport. He was arrested by Master Norton, Captain of Norham Castle and became a prisoner of the Bishop of Durham. The English privy council was interested in his case and the 2,000 crowns cash he was rumoured to have been carrying. He was also deemed to owe £105 from the Durham Hospital, as Mary and Philip were reclaiming properties for the church. John was transferred to the Fleet Prison in London. He finally came before the Privy Council on 22 December 1555, where his offence was called a "March treason." John was pardoned and given permission to seek redress for the money confiscated at Norham. He declared that he would not pursue his money.

== Scottish Reformation Crisis ==
John was forfeited as a traitor by the Parliament of Scotland on 5 December 1548, for his crimes in January 1548 of assisting Grey of Wilton, keeping the House of Saltoun, and persuading lieges of Scotland to form leagues against Mary, Queen of Scots. On 5 December 1558, the forfeiture was reversed on the grounds that the procedure was flawed because Alexander was out of the country at the time. The sentence against Crichton of Brunstane was withdrawn in the same terms on the same day.

During the crisis of the Scottish Reformation, John, laird of Ormiston took his followers to face the French troops at Cupar Muir in June 1559. On 31 October 1559 he was involved in a major setback for the Protestant Lords of the Congregation. Ormiston rode to Berwick upon Tweed and carried £1,000 or 6,000 crowns from England to aid their fight against French troops in Scotland . The Earl of Bothwell ambushed him near Haddington and took the money after a sword fight which left John with a wounded face. This caused diplomatic embarrassment as the English were caught out aiding Mary of Guise's rebels.

The English diplomat Thomas Randolph asked Mary to make a full re-instatement of John as laird of Ormiston in 1562. Randolph spent a day at Ormiston on 30 December 1562, while Mary was at Dunbar Castle with her half-brother John Stewart, Commendator of Coldingham, and wrote a letter to his master, William Cecil, while he was there. Randolph listed John amongst those who assisted in the murder of the Queen's Italian secretary David Rizzio in March 1566, with two relatives; his son-in-law the laird of "Haughton" (Herdmanston), and his nephew Sandilands of Calder, and John Crichton, laird of Brunstane, the son of his friend. Two contemporary sources state that John Cockburn came to support Queen Mary and Bothwell at the battle of Carberry Hill in 1567.

Thomas Randolph wrote to John Cockburn in April 1571, saying he had heard from Francis Walsingham, the English ambassador in France, that his son Alexander Cockburn, a student, was in good health.

John Cockburn had a stroke on the High Street of Edinburgh on 22 November 1583 and died.

== Family ==
By 1535, John married Alison Sandilands, (d.1584) daughter of Sir John Sandilands of Calder. John's coat-of-arms was carved at Mid Calder Church in 1541; a fesse cheque between three cocks. The published edition of Henry Balnaves's Confession of Faith was dedicated to Alison Sandilands. Balnaves wrote the book while a prisoner in the Old Palace of Rouen in 1548. The book was published by Thomas Vautrollier in 1584. Vautrollier said Alison's and Knox's secretary Richard Bannatyne had found the manuscript in the hands of a child at Ormiston. Alison and John's children included;

- Alexander Cockburn, (13 June 1536 - 1 September 1563), his epitaph by George Buchanan recording his travels and achievements engraved on a brass plate is at the National Museum of Scotland.
- John Cockburn, who succeeded his father as laird of Ormiston, and was knighted at the coronation of Anne of Denmark on 17 May 1590 and at Parliament in 1592. He was a member of the Privy Council and the council ruling Scotland when James VI was in Norway and Denmark. He was Lord Justice Clerk after Lewis Bellenden. He married Janet Home, a sister of Sir George Home.
- Samuel Cockburn of Templehall and Vogrie, who married Elizabeth Douglas. He went to England as ambassador with William Stewart and John Colville in 1583. He sent some household goods from London to the English diplomat in Edinburgh, Robert Bowes but they were captured by pirates. Elizabeth Douglas was a poet in the circle of William Fowler and contributed a prefatory sonnet to his Triumphs of Petrarch. Fowler wrote an epitaph for her which was printed.
- Sybil Cockburn, married William Sinclair of Herdmanston, 16 February 1566.
- Alison Cockburn,
- Barbara Cockburn (died November 1610), who married George Hamilton of Preston, son of David Hamilton of Fingaltoun.

== Descendants ==
- John Cockburn of Ormiston (c. 1679–1758), descendant important to 18th-century Scottish agricultural improvement.
