= Siege of St Andrews Castle =

1546–47 Siege of St Andrews Castle during the Rough Wooing

- Part of The Rough Wooing
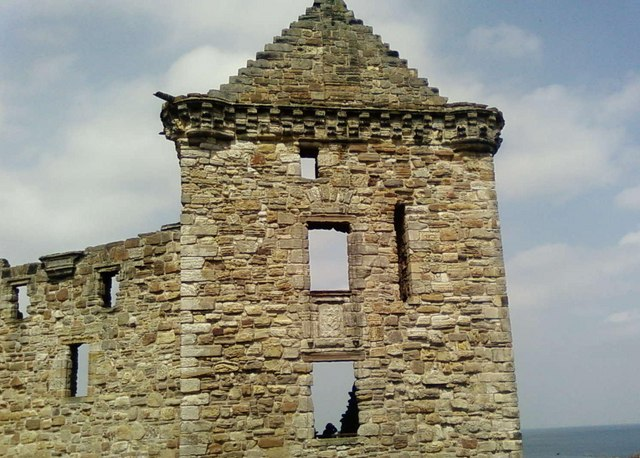
- Fore Tower of St Andrews Castle
Date	1546–1547
Location	St Andrews, Scotland 56°20′20″N 2°47′56″W
Result	Government victory

Belligerents
(Kingdom of Scotland) Scottish Government assisted by the Kingdom of France	(Kingdom of Scotland) Protestant Lairds of Fife assisted by the Kingdom of England

Commanders and leaders
Regent Arran; Leone Strozzi	Norman Leslie; William Kirkcaldy

Casualties and losses
	Unknown
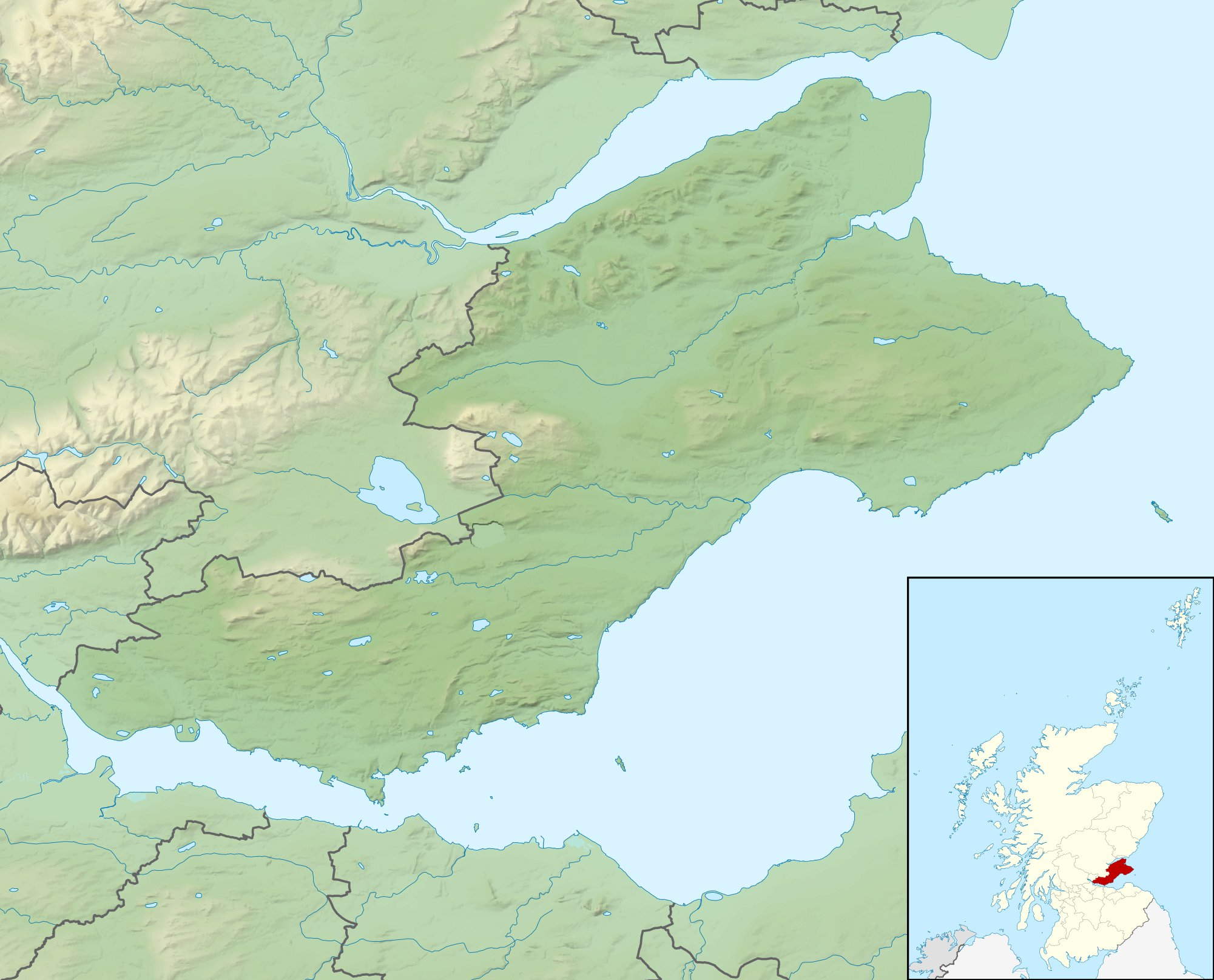
- Location within Fife Siege of St Andrews Castle (Scotland) Siege of St Andrews Castle (British Isles)

The siege of St Andrews Castle (1546–1547) followed the killing of David Cardinal Beaton, Archbishop of St Andrews, by a group of Protestants at St Andrews Castle. They remained in the castle and were besieged by the Governor of Scotland, Regent Arran. However, over 18 months the Scottish besieging forces made little impact, and the Castle finally surrendered to a French naval force after artillery bombardment. The Protestant garrison, including the preacher John Knox, were taken to France and used as galley slaves.

== Murder of the Cardinal ==
St Andrews castle was the residence of Cardinal David Beaton and his mistress Marion Ogilvy. Beaton's strong opposition to the marriage of Mary, Queen of Scots, with Prince Edward, later Edward VI of England, the son and heir of Henry VIII, had led to the war of the Rough Wooing with England.

In 1546, David Beaton imprisoned the Protestant preacher George Wishart in the castle's Sea Tower, then had him burnt at the stake in front of the castle walls on 1 March. Wishart's friends included a group of well-connected Protestant Fife Lairds, some of whom had previously conspired with Henry VIII and his ambassador Ralph Sadler either to capture or assassinate Beaton.

On Saturday 29 May 1546, the lairds formed four teams. Norman Leslie, Master of Rothes, and three men, perhaps by disguising themselves as masons when some building work was in progress, got into the castle. James Melville and his companions got in by pretending to have an appointment with the Cardinal. William Kirkcaldy of Grange and eight men gained entry to the castle at the drawbridge and when they were joined by John Leslie of Parkhill, they overpowered the porter Ambrose Stirling, stabbed him and threw his body in the ditch.

The genuine masons and the garrison supervised by Kirkcaldy left at the castle gate, where the Cardinal's mistress Marion Ogilvy had recently exited. Robert Lindsay of Pitscottie wrote that Peter Carmichael stabbed the Cardinal in his chamber, or on the spiral stair, in the east blockhouse tower. To deter the Cardinal's supporters in the town led by the Provost, James Learmonth of Dairsie, from attempting a rescue, they hung his body in public view from his window or from the parapet at the front of the castle.

The son of the Governor of Scotland, James Hamilton, 3rd Earl of Arran, and second after his father in line to the crown of Scotland, was already in the castle as Beaton's hostage: now he was the pawn of the Fife lairds. John Knox wrote that the defenders covered Beaton's body with salt, wrapped it in lead, and buried it in the Sea Tower of the castle. David Lyndsay made the Cardinal's ghost voice this detail in his Tragedie of the Cardinall; "Thay saltit me, syne cloist me in a kist."

== Siege ==
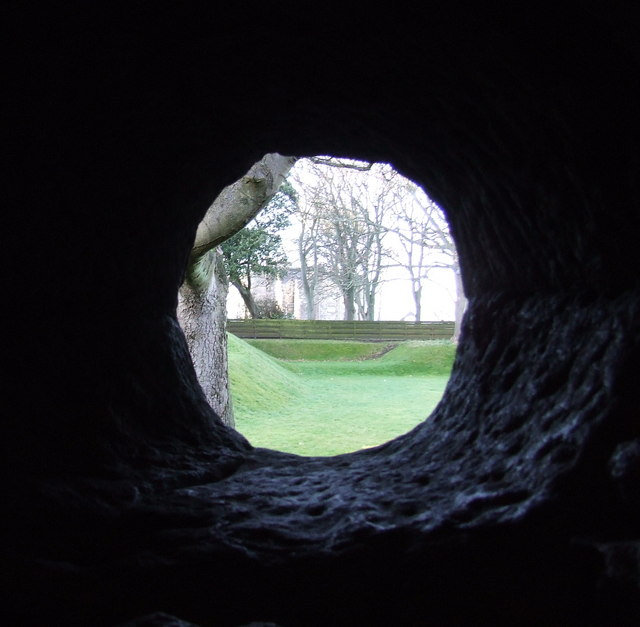
Gunloop at the castle

Following the murder, the Protestants took refuge in the castle. These "Castilians" included; Norman Leslie, Master of Rothes; James Kirkcaldy of Grange; Master Henry Balnaves; and Captain John Borthwick. Regent Arran was forced to delay his response as he was busy at the siege of Dumbarton Castle on the west of Scotland, which he took from the English on 8 July 1546.

St. Andrews Castle Act 1545
- Act of Parliament
- Parliament of Scotland
- Long title: Tuiching my lord Governouris eldest sone withhaldin in the castell of Sanctandrois.
- Citation: 1545 c. 12

Dates
- Royal assent: 14 August 1546

Text of statute as originally enacted

The Parliament of Scotland at Stirling on 11 June 1546 issued a proclamation that none should sell the Castilians any kind of supplies. The lairds were summoned to plead their case in Edinburgh; they refused and Norman Leslie was declared a traitor. For the time of his captivity, Regent Arran's son was excluded from the Scottish royal succession. William Kirkcaldy of Grange negotiated with Henry VIII in England, offering James Hamilton to become a hostage in England. In September, Henry VIII ordered some supplies to be sent in six ships commanded by William Tyrrell with the military engineer Richard Lee, and that the Lairds should hand over Hamilton to be brought to England (but this was not done). English intervention was hampered by Scottish diplomacy in peace negotiations. England and France were now at peace. A mission to St Andrews would be a new cause for war between Scotland and England, preventing the 'comprehension' of Scotland in this new treaty. Mary of Hungary believed the Scottish diplomats's chief purpose was delaying English action at St Andrews. Scotland remained at war with the Empire, meaning that there was no redress for piracy, and she sent her envoy, Matthew Strick, to Scotland to clarify the situation.

At first at St Andrews, according to Pitscottie, the garrison harassed the countryside round about the town, raising fires and "using their bodies in lechery with fair women." Regent Arran made preparations for a long siege. Monasteries in Scotland were ordered to pay a tax of £6,000 towards the costs of recovering the castle. Norman Leslie and Kirkcaldy of Grange with their accomplices were excommunicated for the slaughter of the Cardinal. On 23 November a copy of this "great cursing" was made and delivered to the Castle.

== The Scottish siege ==
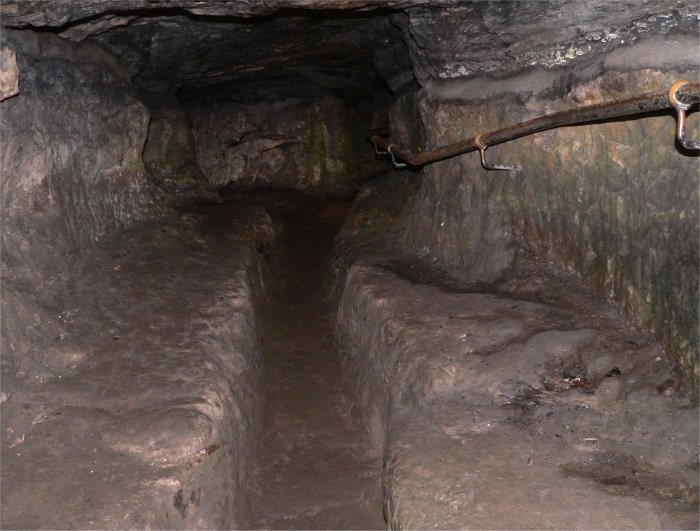
The countermine today

In October 1546 Arran and the Scottish Privy Council met at St Andrews, and siege operations commenced in earnest. A mine, a tunnel to undermine the Fore Tower or enter the castle, was begun by Regent Arran's men. The French ambassador Odet de Selve knew about the mine by 10 November, from an 18-day-old eye-witness account. The defenders dug a successful counter-mine to meet it. Both the mine and counter-mines were cut through solid rock. The tunnels were rediscovered in 1879 and remain open to the public today. The defenders dug three mine tunnels before they reached the attackers. The successful countermine tunnel was started near the Fore Tower outside the walls of the main central enclosure of the castle.

Arran's guns included "Crook-mow" or "Thrawynmouthe", and "Deaf Meg." The artillery was directed by Robert Hamilton of Briggis who spent at least £3756 Scots on the wages of workmen called pioneers who handled the heavy guns and made emplacements. Arran offered terms if the lairds vacated the castle and released his son. The garrison would be conveyed to Blackness Castle. These terms were refused. Arran brought his guns to the 'west trenches' to batter down the Sea Tower, hall, and chapel from the west, and shot at the hall and the chapel from the east with feathered bullets. The defenders shot back and killed the royal gunner John Borthwick, Argyll's master gunner, and other artillerymen. After two days of losses to his gunners the Regent abandoned the cannon.

In November, Arran heard that an English army was on its way to relieve the Castle and commanded other Fife lairds to support him. John Wemyss of that ilk was ordered to bring his followers and whatever artillery they had to resist a sea-invasion. Provisions sent for the siege in December by boat from Leith included 60 stones of lead taken from the roof of the Great Hall of Holyroodhouse. When supplies were short the defenders made a new exit to the sea in the east wall. Supplies were obtained from the Laird of Montquhany in Tentsmuir Forest, but Walter Melville and twenty men died because of poor rations and bad fish.

=== The truce of December 1546 ===
Following requests made in person, Henry VIII made plans to assist the Protestants within the castle. He wrote to Arran from Nonsuch Palace on 20 December 1546, requesting Arran to desist from the siege, and threatening to relieve the lairds. Balnaves, Leslie and William Kirkcaldy were each given £100 by England's Privy Council. The English Chancellor, Thomas Wriothesley, told Arran's diplomats in London, David Panter and Adam Otterburn, to ask the Regent to desist from the siege. The grounds given were that the Castilians were Henry's friends and well-wishers to the English marriage. Panter and Otterburn refused, as it was not their business, but sent a note of the request to Arran.

However, a truce or concord was already agreed on 18 December 1546, which Knox described as the 'coloured appointment.' Arran's negotiators were David Lyndsay the Lyon Herald, the Justice Clerk, the Provost of Aberdeen, the Earls of Huntly, Argyll, and Marischal, and Lord Gray, who spoke at the walls of the castle. Those in the castle would wait on the receipt of an absolution from the Pope for the murder, and would then be allowed to surrender on good terms. A meeting of the privy council at St Andrews on 19 December discussed how the castle was not winnable except by famine. The agreement was probably cynical on both sides. As a pledge of good faith the Castilians sent two hostages to Arran in December 1546, two younger sons of the Laird of Grange, and a brother of Lord Ruthven, known as the "Ald Person". On 20 December, the hostages or 'pledges' were taken to Kinghorn. It was later said that Henri Cleutin, a diplomatic adviser to Mary of Guise had counselled Arran that those in the castle should be promised what they asked for, and beheaded when they came out.

=== Stalemate ===
An English invasion to support the Castilians never came, but Balnaves secured the services of two Italian military engineers in Henry's service, Guillaume de Rosetti and Archangelo Arcano. After Henry's death on 27 January 1547 his son Edward VI did not send an armed force. The Castilians continued to sue for aid at the English court, and were able to travel in person to England by sea. The Scottish ambassador Adam Otterburn recorded their presence in London. In February, the English admiral Andrew Dudley was ordered to show his fleet near St Andrews Castle to encourage the besieged allies of England.

English ships brought arms and supplies, but St Andrews was blockaded by the Scottish navy: in March 1547 Admiral Elmes and Andrew Dudley were ordered to sail from Lindisfarne with a convoy that had been repulsed. Dudley brought a contract for the garrison with terms for continued English support, in return for their continued promotion of the English royal marriage plan, and eventual surrender of the castle to an English relieving force.

The Castilians had also suggested that Henry should write to Charles V, Holy Roman Emperor to persuade the Pope not to grant the absolution. This would prolong the siege, giving more time for Henry (and now his son) to send an army, and effect their goals. Although the absolution arrived in April 1547, the Castilians refused to surrender. James Stewart of Cardonald wrote that the Castilians said in private; "that they would rather have a measure of wheat than all the Pope's remissions."

At this time, in April 1547, five English victualling ships were captured and brought to Leith. John Knox entered the castle and served as the garrison's preacher for the remainder of the siege. For a time Knox had the freedom to pass to and from the castle to preach in the parish church. According to the Earl of Glencairn, one of the besieged garrison, Ninian Cockburn, was a spy for the Governor. Later in the year, Ninian was involved in the handover of Broughty Castle to the English.

== The French siege ==
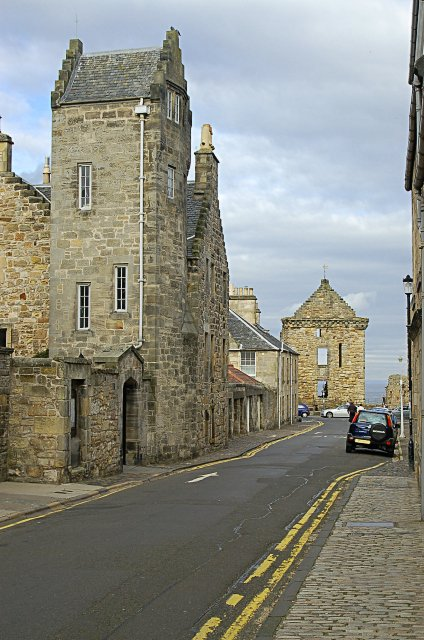
French guns were towed through the streets

This peaceful interlude came to end, however, in July 1547 when Henry II of France sent a fleet to take the castle for the Scottish Government. The force was commanded by his admiral and military engineer, the Italian Leone Strozzi who directed a devastating artillery bombardment to dislodge the Protestant lairds. French intelligence included recent cartography by Jean Rotz and Nicolas de Nicolay who came on the voyage.

Although the fleet was seen by English observers, they seemed not to know its purpose, assuming it came to embark Mary, Queen of Scots. Protector Somerset told the Imperial Ambassador, François van der Delft, that the French fleet was going to assault some unimportant fort in Scotland that would be easily recaptured. He would send 24 armed ships in pursuit to blockade St Andrews and the Firth of Forth. Arran himself may not have known much in advance, but he did travel from the siege at Langholm to meet the French at St Andrews

After ineffectual bombardment from the French ships, perhaps over 20 days, the land assault began on 28 July, and the defenders were already depleted by plague. According to Pitscottie, the lairds knew an expert was in the field against them when their own Italian engineer observed cannon being winched into position with ropes rather than exposing the besiegers to their fire. Guns were also placed on St Salvator's and the cathedral towers. The battery began before dawn on Sunday 30 July. The castle was quickly rendered indefensible; within six hours according to Knox and Pitscottie.

John Knox included his account of the French assault in his History of the Reformation of Scotland. According to Knox, the French fleet summoned the castle to surrender on the last day of June. Over the next two days naval bombardment only dislodged some roofing slates, but the castle's guns caused casualties among the galley rowers and the land army. A damaged galley had to be towed to safety. The final assault was delayed, according to Knox, by waiting for the return of Arran from Langhope in the Scottish Borders and commenced on 28 July. Guns were placed on the Abbey and Saint Salvator's College. The next day the firepower of 14 cannons overwhelmed the defenders who were also stricken by sickness. Knox wrote that "befoir ten houris of the day, the haill sowth quarter, betwix the foir tour and the East blok-house was maid saltable. The lower transe (passageway) was condempned, diverse slane into it, and the East blok-house was schote off fra the rest of the place, betwix ten houris and ellevin." Heavy rain then silenced the guns and William Kirkcaldy of Grange began to negotiate the surrender with Leone Strozzi, Prior of Capua.

Certain news that the French fleet was besieging the castle had arrived in London by 27 July. Too late, on 1 August 1547, Edward Clinton was ordered to engage the French force at St Andrews. Admiral Clinton was to embark on the Pansy at Harwich and make for St Andrews "as fast as wind or weather will serve", and raise the siege or rescue the Protestant lairds and James Hamilton. Clinton, who lay at Orford Ness, did not even get this order till 9 August.

== Aftermath ==
The defeated Protestants were taken away; some were imprisoned in France while others, including Knox, were condemned to the galleys. The immediate consequence of the siege was Protector Somerset's orders to mobilise a large English army for Scotland by sea and land.

Somerset was warned that Arran had obtained a register of Protestants and English supporters from Henry Balnaves's quarters in the castle. According to Jean de Saint Mauris, an Imperial diplomat, the English ambassador, Nicholas Wotton complained to Henry II of France that his action was a violation of the Treaty of Ardres or Camp, because it was well known the castle was held by Scots on behalf of England. Henry II replied that the castle was occupied by the Castilians after the treaty was made, and so if things had happened as Wotton said, England was in breach of the treaty.

The success of the French mission and Scotland's subsequent defeat at the battle of Pinkie strengthened the Auld Alliance, and subsequently in 1548 Mary, Queen of Scots was taken to France as the prospective bride of the French Dauphin.

Norman Leslie was imprisoned at Cherbourg, and Balnaves at Rouen. Some of the garrison were kept in the fortress of Mont Saint-Michel, from where Robert and William Leslie, William Kirkcaldy, and Peter Carmichael managed to overpower their captors and make their way to Rouen and Le Conquet and took ship to England.

The castle was slighted, and subsequently substantially rebuilt by Archbishop John Hamilton, the illegitimate brother of Regent Arran, and successor to David Beaton.

== Analysis ==
=== The plan ===
The manifesto, if such there was, of the Fife lairds was not recorded. Thus the degree of deliberation or opportunism in their actions remains debatable. The historian Gordon Donaldson noted that the Lairds' plan included the hostage James Hamilton. Apart from his importance as the Governor's heir, Hamilton had been suggested as a possible husband for Henry's younger daughter, the Princess Elizabeth or Mary, Queen of Scots. Donaldson suggested that Regent Arran did not pursue the siege so vigorously because his son was within. More recently, Elizabeth Bonner has downplayed Hamilton's significance as a hostage for the Protestant lairds, focussing her study on the French initiative and highlighting that the French preparations were kept secret from the English. She notes the lack of evidence for Henry as a prime mover in the laird's initiative.

The sixteenth century Scottish Catholic historian John Lesley described James Hamilton merely as the most important of a number of noblemen's sons in the castle in the Cardinal's service. He wrote that the Lairds were motivated by grievances over the Cardinal's property transactions rather than by politics or religion. Although James Lindsay wrote straightaway to England with the news of the murder, including that Hamilton was kept prisoner by the lairds along with the servant he calls the Cardinal's chamber child, he did not express the laird's intent.

Alexander Crichton of Brunstane had previously offered that James Kirkcaldy and Norman Leslie would capture or assassinate the Cardinal for Henry VIII when he and Somerset planned the attack on Edinburgh in 1544. Margaret Sanderson in the biography Cardinal of Scotland notes the assumption of international responses that the murder was done for England's interests. In response to French initiatives, English diplomats freely acknowledged that the Castilians occupied the Castle for England, and May 1549 a delegation sent to Arran had commission to treat of the exchange of prisoners Henry Balnaves, James Kirkcaldy, Henry Moneypenny and the rest of the King's servants taken in St Andrews Castle. Another initiative for the release of the Castilians in France was suggested in September 1549, by the English soldier Thomas Holcroft. He hoped to organize the capture of George Douglas of Pittendreich to facilitate the release of the captives.

=== Military aspects ===
It is known from Beaton's financial records that he had prepared gabions (baskets filled with gravel for gun emplacements) and bought new cannons in anticipation of an English invasion. Other commentators, such as Marcus Merriman have seen the failure of the Scottish forces to take the newly equipped castle as indicative of inadequate technology of Arran's army. The Castilians themselves attributed Arran's failure to continue his artillery battery to the losses they had inflicted on Arran's gunners. Henry Stewart, Lord Methven, the master of the royal artillery, thought the castle could have been won with Arran's own "sobir artalyerij" and pointed out the ease and efficiency of the French captains who "ordourlie persewit" their short assault.

Italian artillery specialists were employed by both the defenders (via England) and the French besiegers. The 16th century chronicle historian Robert Lindsay of Pitscottie wrote that the French gunners, who rapidly took the castle in July 1547 criticised the defenders for not troubling to demolish towers and other places which could serve as gun emplacements against the castle.
