= Andrew Dudley =

English soldier, courtier, and diplomat, born 1507

Sir Andrew Dudley KG
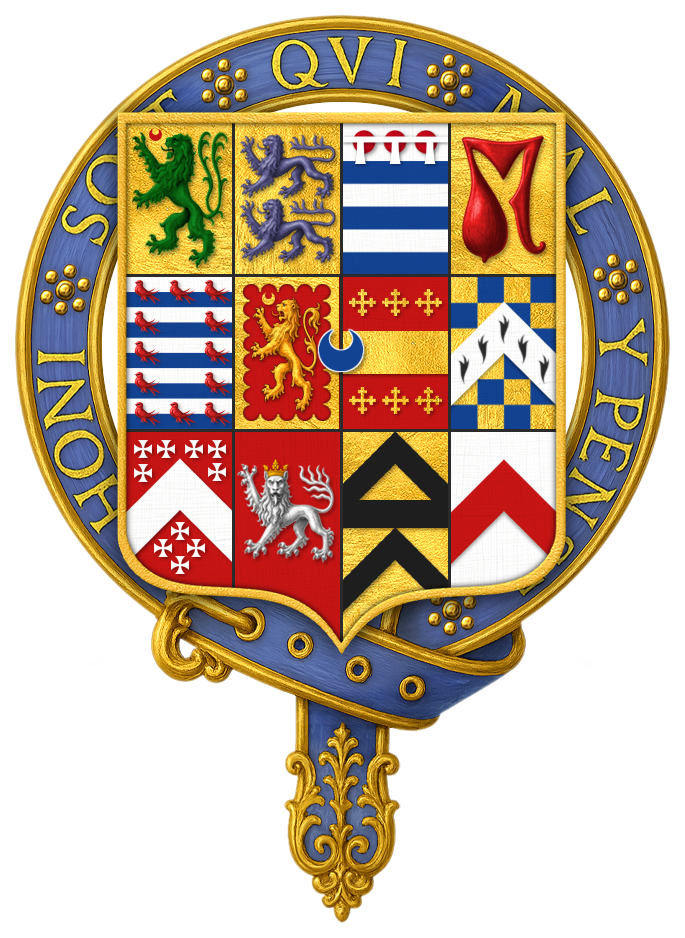
- Quartered Arms of Sir Andrew Dudley, KG
- Born: c.1507
- Died: 1559 (aged 51–52); London, England
- Known for: Soldier and courtier
- Parent(s): Edmund Dudley; Elizabeth Grey, 6th Baroness Lisle

Sir Andrew Dudley, KG (c. 1507 – 1559) was an English soldier, courtier, and diplomat. A younger brother of John Dudley, 1st Duke of Northumberland, he served in Henry VIII's navy and obtained court offices under Edward VI. In 1547–1548 he acted as admiral of the fleet and participated in the War of the Rough Wooing in Scotland, where he commanded the English garrison of Broughty Castle. He was appointed captain of the fortress of Guînes in the Pale of Calais in late 1551. There he got involved in a dispute with the Lord Deputy of Calais, which ended only when both men were replaced in October 1552.

In October 1549 Andrew Dudley became one of Edward VI's Chief Gentlemen of the Privy Chamber and later keeper of the Palace of Westminster, in which function he was responsible for the Royal Wardrobe and Privy Purse. In early 1553 he was sent on a diplomatic mission to the Emperor Charles V to suggest peace talks between France and the Empire. Andrew Dudley was bethrothed to Margaret Clifford, a first cousin of Lady Jane Grey, in June 1553; yet his marriage plans came to naught with the accession of Mary I, and on 19 August 1553 he was condemned to death for his part in his brother's attempt to establish Lady Jane on the English throne. Released in January 1555, he lived in London until his death in 1559.

== Family and early career ==
Andrew Dudley was one of three sons of Edmund Dudley, a councillor of King Henry VII, and his second wife Elizabeth Grey, daughter of Edward Grey, 4th Viscount Lisle. When he was a toddler, his father was executed by the young Henry VIII as a scapegoat for the former king's financial policies. His eldest brother was John Dudley, later Duke of Northumberland, who sought to advance him in the king's service. Andrew Dudley served in the household of Thomas Howard, 3rd Duke of Norfolk, and as an officer of the exchequer in the 1540s. Answering a complaint against exchequer activities in October 1540, Norfolk told the Privy Council that the only two people he had ever found jobs for were Andrew Dudley and Edward Belingeham.

The brother of the Lord High Admiral, Dudley served in the royal navy and commanded the new royal ship Swallow in 1545. In March 1546, he went on his first diplomatic mission to the Regent of Flanders. In his role as Equerry of the Stable, he delivered Henry VIII's gift of hackney horses, greyhounds and running dogs.

== In Scotland, 1547–1548 ==
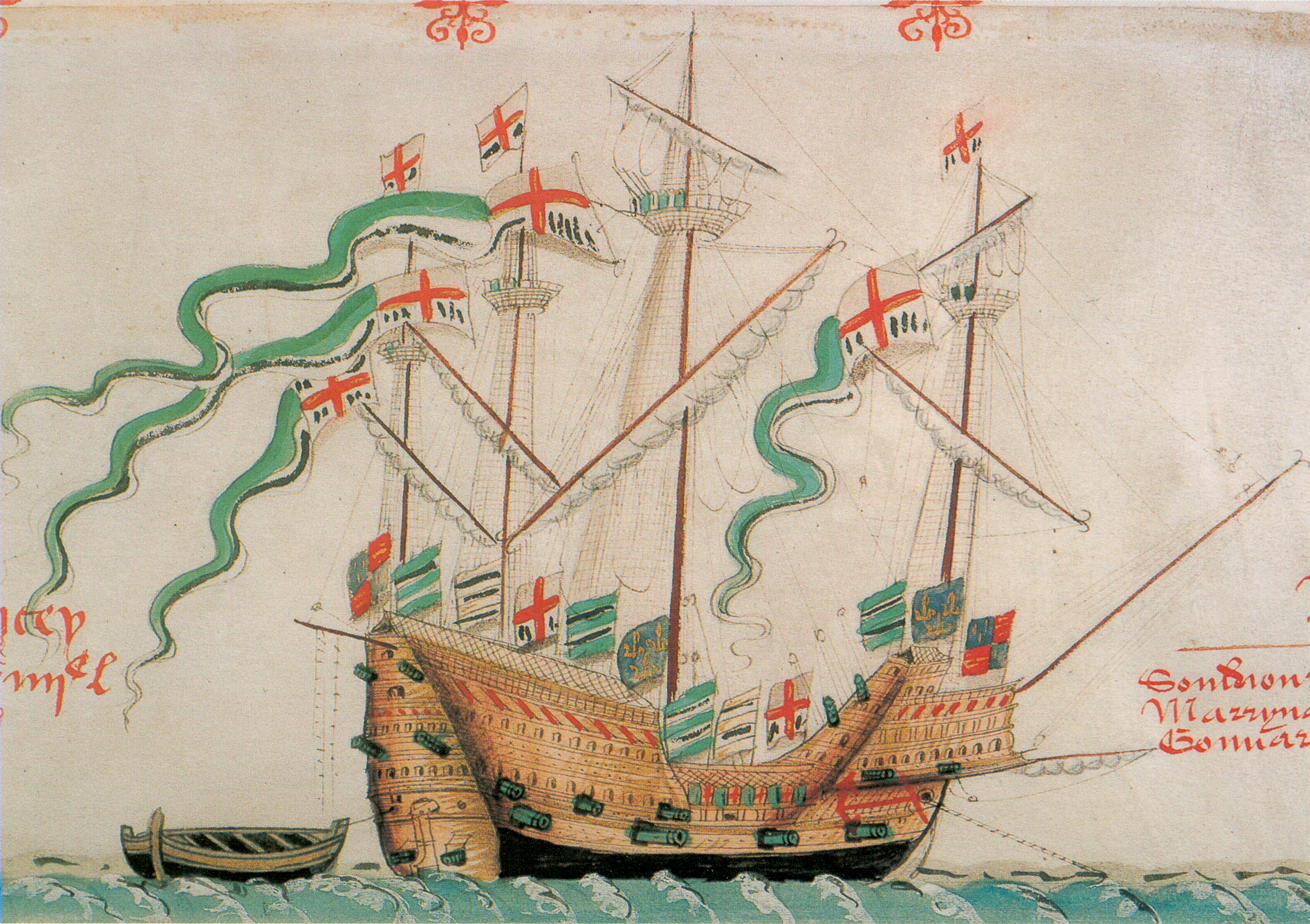
The carrack Pauncy from the Anthony Roll

In early 1547 Protector Somerset, the English regent, was contemplating to take up the War of the Rough Wooing once more to press home the agreed marriage of Edward VI and Mary Queen of Scots. On 27 February Andrew Dudley was appointed admiral of the fleet. He was to oversee the "annoyance of the Scots" in the North Sea and to interrupt the shipping of munition from France to Scotland. He was ordered to show his fleet near St Andrews Castle to encourage the besieged allies of England.

On 7 March he captured one of the Scottish principal ships, the Great Lion off Dover, giving her a broadside from the Pauncey (correctly the Pensée, sometimes called the Pansy). Odet de Selve, the French ambassador in London, gained a detailed account from Nicolas d'Arfeville, a French painter and cartographer. Dudley was 30 miles from Yarmouth when he saw the Great Lion, with the Lyonesse, the Mary Gallante and another unnamed Scottish ship. The Great Lion was overwhelmed by superior firepower, and the others surrendered, excepting the unnamed ship. The Lion was lost while being towed to Yarmouth when she grounded on a sandbank. Those on board were brought as prisoners to the Tower of London, and at least one notable passenger was killed in the firefight. The Privy Council sent Dudley a letter of commendation on 10 March 1547 for "his hardy enterprise against the Scots" with more detailed instructions. Dudley was told to lay up the Pauncey and other ships for repair; he was to release his Scottish prisoners, except notables, "gentlemen of estimation", and 40 sailors judged to be the best seamen and pilots. Those released would pay their ransom at £4 for a master or officer, and 40 shillings a sailor or mariner.

Dudley then sailed North to treat with the Fife lairds who had killed Cardinal Beaton. They were holding St Andrews Castle against the Regent Arran with his eldest son James Hamilton as hostage. The lairds, who became known as the "Castilians", signed a contract with Dudley, according to which they were to receive English aid to hold the castle against the Scottish government:

for the better ... surity of themselves and His Majesty's friends in Scotland and the advancement and perfection of the said marriage [as well as] a perpetual peace, unity and ... natural love between both the realms.

The Castilians promised to surrender St. Andrews Castle and Arran's son to the English when they should appear. Dudley also struck a bargain with Lord Gray, a disaffected Scottish noble who owned Broughty Castle, a fortress near Dundee. The chronicler and eye-witness William Patten noted its strategic importance: "it standeth in such sort at the mouth of the river Tay, that being gotten, both Dundee and [Perth], and many other towns else shall become subject to this hold or be compelled to forgo their use of the river." Lord Gray's contribution would be the surrender of his castle and help in taking Perth.

St. Andrews Castle fell in July 1547, which greatly strengthened French influence in Scotland and triggered an English invasion. Andrew Dudley assisted the campaign at sea, under the command of Lord Clinton. Shortly after the Battle of Pinkie Cleugh Dudley was knighted by Edward Seymour, Duke of Somerset. On 20 September 1547 he was appointed captain of the English garrison at Broughty Castle. Lord Gray had surrendered it after three token cannon shots from the English ships. Dudley complained to Somerset in October 1547 that "as for soldiers, there was never man had so weak a company, given all to eating and drinking and slothfulness", though, "the house stands well". However, it had "scant window to shut, nor door, nor bolt, ... nor nail". Re-fortification was supervised by a resident Italian engineer, Master John Rossetti, and included building a new platform for cannon on the roof and strengthening of the curtain wall.

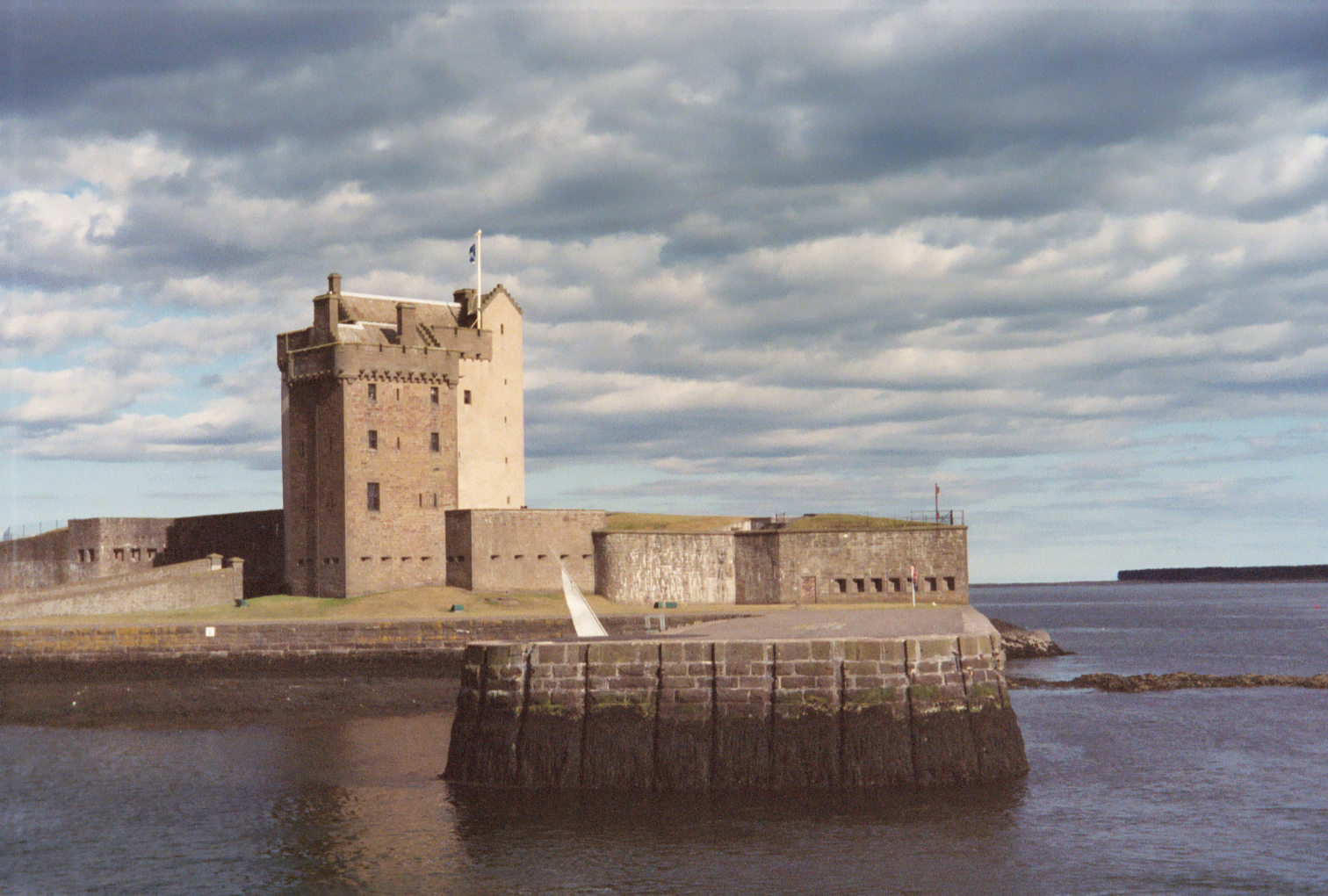
Broughty Castle, the English garrison of which Andrew Dudley commanded in 1547–1548

Andrew Dudley secured a bond of alliance from the town of Dundee by firing on the town from his two ships, the Bark Ager and the Mary Hambroughe, at the end of October 1547. In an effort to promote the Protestant Reformation, he hoped to distribute Tyndale and Frithe's Bible in Dundee. Lord Gray and the Master of Ruthven continued to bargain for the surrender of Perth in December 1547, but the English never secured the town. Dudley was assisted by Thomas Wyndham who sailed several times up the Tay towards Perth looking for supplies.

With the help of Andrew Dudley and Lord Gray, Wyndham placed a garrison of 20 "tall men" in the Steeple of Dundee. On 22 January 1548, Dudley sent Wyndham across the Forth to Fife to burn houses. Dudley's plan was to draw his besiegers to attack him and he kept behind his main force. The Scots and French took the opportunity offered to attack Broughty and were repulsed back to Dundee after a "hot skirmish". The trick did not work a second time on 25 January, and Wyndham's landing party in Fife encountered an ambush of 600 men; 10 soldiers were killed and 20 sailors injured. Dudley built a second fort to command Dundee in March 1548 with the engineer Master John Rossetti and Sir Thomas Palmer. He was relieved at Broughty by Thomas Wyndham's nephew, Sir John Luttrell. On 3 April 1548, Dudley and Luttrell were instructed by the Privy Council to try to agree a yearly pension for Lord Gray at a figure between 600 and 1000 crowns.

== Military and court appointments ==
Dudley's next military appointment after his service in Scotland was under Lord Russell against the Western Rebellion in August 1549. In early 1551 Dudley became captain of the English garrison at Guînes. However, he incurred large debts "by his service", and became involved in a dispute with Lord Willoughby, the Lord Deputy of Calais. In January 1552 they were recalled to England and summoned before the Privy Council. Finally, to resolve the feud, both men were relieved of their posts in October. During 1552 Dudley also surveyed the coastal defenses of Portsmouth and the Isle of Wight to advise on their improvement.

Under Edward VI, Dudley also obtained court appointments and responsibilities; a member of the Privy Chamber, on 24 March 1547 he was given custody of a purse of £1435-9s-6d. Dudley's brother John ousted the Protector in October 1549, and Andrew became one of the newly created Chief Gentlemen of the Privy Chamber. These four "principal gentlemen" had "the singular care" of the King's person and were each rewarded with £100 p.a. A year later Dudley also became keeper of the Palace of Westminster, where he made an inventory of wardrobe and household goods. Effectively in charge of the Privy Purse, he was responsible for receiving and paying out royal cash and looking after "all the jewels ... and other things in the palace".

=== Mission to the Emperor, 1553 ===
In 1552 Dudley was made a Knight of the Garter; at the end of the year he was sent on a diplomatic mission to discuss Edward VI's hopes to mediate for peace between the Empire and France. He first travelled to Brussels, where he was received by Mary of Hungary on 8 January 1553. Impatient to see the Emperor himself, he tried to intercept him on his way to Flanders. Sir Richard Morrison, the English resident ambassador with Charles V, knew nothing of this until he met Dudley at Treves. The ailing ruler was averse to be molested by diplomats while journeying, nevertheless Morrison arranged an interview at Luxembourg in which Charles referred them to a later occasion. On 11 February 1553 the Emperor gave the Englishmen an audience at Brussels. When Dudley offered to kiss his hand, he embraced him. The visitors noted that the chamber was hung with tapestries depicting the Emperor's victories at Tunis. Charles V was non-committal, declaring that he was well-disposed to peace if he only could trust the French king. On returning to England Dudley had an audience with Edward on 19 February. Jehan Scheyfve, the Emperor's agent, reported that Dudley was discreet, and only mentioned that Charles had given him a present. The French ambassador in London was not pleased. Dudley was elected MP for Oxfordshire in the March parliament of 1553, carrying Edward's train at the proceedings.

== Marriage plans and disgrace ==
In April 1553, Dudley was commanded by the King to release cloth of silver and gold and velvet for the marriage of his nephew Lord Guildford to Lady Jane Grey, which was celebrated on 25 May. In June, Jehan de Scheyfve reported that Dudley himself would marry Margaret Clifford, a granddaughter of Mary Tudor, Queen of France, and cousin of Lady Jane, and that he would be made Lieutenant-Governor of the North. Dudley had even reserved a number of items from the wardrobe at Westminster for the marriage, including jewels, silver and gilt cups, a hair-brush, velvet dog-collars, and a pair of pictures of Diana and Actaeon. However, Edward VI died on 6 July 1553, having named Lady Jane Grey as his heir.

Andrew Dudley assembled a force of 500 men at Ware, Hertfordshire to assist in his brother's campaign against Mary Tudor. Presumably arrested with him in East Anglia, he was imprisoned in the Tower on 25 July. Accused with his family of rebellion and high treason, Dudley stood trial at Westminster Hall on 19 August 1553. He pleaded guilty and only asked that his jewels that were in the keeping of his wardrobe colleague Arthur Stourton should not be lost. On 21 August 1553, the day before John Dudley's execution, he appeared with him and other condemned persons at the Tower Chapel St. Peter ad Vincula to hear mass. Andrew's life was spared, and he was released in January 1555.

In April 1555, after his formal pardon, Philip and Mary granted Dudley a pension of £100 p.a. He was allowed to retain some of his earlier possessions, which had been valued at £555 at the time of his arrest in 1553. He moved to Tothill Street, London and, "sick of body", made his will in July 1556. In it he tried to reclaim jewels and other stuffs the Earl of Cumberland had received in advance of Dudley's intended marriage with Margaret Clifford. Among the intended beneficiaries were his nephews Ambrose, Robert Dudley, and Henry Sidney, his nephew-by-marriage. He died three years later, sometime before his will was proved on 22 November 1559.
