= Norman Leslie (soldier) =

Scottish Nobleman

Norman Leslie (died 29 August 1554), was a 16th-century Scottish nobleman. The leader of the party which assassinated Cardinal David Beaton, he was forced to flee Scotland, serving the monarchs of England and France. He died serving the latter in 1554.

== Family and early life ==
Norman was the eldest son of George Leslie, 4th Earl of Rothes, by Margaret, only daughter of William Crichton, 3rd Lord Crichton, denominated, 1 April 1517, his 'sponsa affidata.'. No marriage ceremony is recorded to have taken place, and the marriage was in 1520 declared null and void. Norman seems to have been regarded as illegitimate.

The notices in the 'Lord Treasurer's Accounts' in 1537 and 1539 of dresses furnished to him indicate that he at this time held some office at court. On 7 December 1541 the office of sheriff of Fife, then made hereditary in the Rothes family, was bestowed on him for life, his father personally resigning it.

He is described by Buchanan as a young man of such accomplishments that he had not his equal in all Scotland. He fought at Solway Moss in 1542 and was taken prisoner, but received his liberty as the result of the bond signed by the captive Scottish nobles to promote the interests of Henry VIII in Scotland. To this is perhaps partly traceable his zeal against Cardinal Beaton, but it was at least quickened by an act passed, 12 December 1543, at the instance of the cardinal, restoring to Sir James Colville the lands of Castle Wemyss, which on the forfeiture of Colville had been bestowed by James V on the Rothes family.

== Murder of Cardinal Beaton ==
On 17 April 1544 Henry VIII received information that the Master of Rothes and others were willing to undertake the slaughter of the cardinal as he passed through Fife, on condition that they had the assurance of Henry's protection afterwards. Obtaining no satisfactory answer, they did not take advantage of the supposed opportunity, and subsequently, with his father, Norman appears to have given a pledge of personal service to the cardinal. He actively supported Charteris, the nominee of Beaton, against Lord Ruthven, in their contest for the provostship of Perth.

He also fought against the English at the battle of Ancrum Moor, 12 February 1545, when his opportune arrival with three hundred spearmen from Fife, and with the news that the Scotts of Buccleuch were following on his heels, decided the Scots to risk the battle. Negotiations for the murder of the cardinal were, with or without the sanction of Leslie, resumed with Henry on 30 May 1545, and were continued till at least 20 October following. How much longer a blank in Henry's Scottish correspondence renders it impossible to state.

The execution of Wishart at the insistence of the cardinal, 1 March 1546, was apparently rather an opportune pretext for the cardinal's assassination than the direct cause of it. The statement of contemporary writers that Norman Leslie had not long before the murder a violent personal quarrel with Beaton seems probable. Norman Leslie was the leader of the conspirators. The castle of St. Andrews, where Beaton lived, was seized by men under his command, but he took no personal part in the act of assassination on 29 May 1546, and John Leslie of Parkhill, his uncle, struck the fatal blow, after the cardinal had requested that Norman, whom he called his friend, should come to him. A dagger erroneously reputed to have been used by Norman is preserved in Leslie House, Fife.

== After the murder ==
After the murder Norman and his associates took refuge in the cardinal's stronghold. They were besieged in St Andrew's Castle by the governor of Scotland, Regent Arran. On 11 March 1547 Norman and his colleagues, Henry Balnaves, James Kirkcaldy of Grange, and Alexander Whitelaw of Newgrange witnessed a pledge made by Patrick Gray, 4th Lord Gray to Edward VI. The lairds in the castle, sometimes called the Castilians, were summoned to answer for the murder, and, failing to do so, were on 30 July 1547 denounced as rebels. On the same day the castle was surrendered to the French, and a condition having been made that the lives of all within it should be spared, its principal defenders were carried captives to France.

Norman probably made his escape from France at the same time as Sir William Kirkcaldy of Grange, but there is no direct information on the point. After his release, he, according to John Spottiswood, returned to Scotland, but on search being made for him he escaped by sea to Denmark. Thence he crossed over to England, where for some time he was in the enjoyment of a pension from Edward VI.

The accession of Queen Mary in 1553 compelled him to leave England, and he went to France, where he entered into the service of Henry II. He was mortally wounded in an action before the stronghold of Renti, near Cambrai, on 14 August 1554. At the head of thirty Scots he heroically charged sixty horsemen armed with culverins, unhorsing five of them with his spear before it broke. He made his way back to the constable of France, his horse dropping down dead at the constable's feet.

He was brought into the king's tent, and died of his wounds on 29 August, fifteen days afterwards. His bravery and the manner of his death so impressed the French king that he used his influence with the queen-regent and the estates to obtain for the other confederates against Beaton the reversion of their lands.

Leslie was married to Isobel Lindsay, daughter of John Lindsay, 5th Lord Lindsay, but left had no children with her. He did however have two natural sons, named Robert and John.
