= Steeple Church =

- Old Steeple; St Mary's Tower
- Steeple Church
- 56.4594°N 2.973°W
- Location: Dundee, Scotland
- Denomination: Church of Scotland

Architecture
- Architect: Samuel Bell (rebuild)
- Architectural type: Medieval
- Completed: 1470s

Specifications
- Height: 50 metres (160 ft)

The Steeple Church occupies the western part of the historic "City Churches" building in Dundee, Scotland. It is a congregation of the Church of Scotland.

The "City Churches" are located in the city centre, adjacent to the Overgate shopping centre. The building is unusual as having two congregations within the same structure – the other congregation (at the eastern end) is Dundee Parish Church (St Mary's). The middle building ceased functioning as a place of worship in the early 1990s.

St Mary's Tower, the clock tower at the western end of the City Churches, is the oldest part of the church, and is currently operated by Dundee City Council's heritage department and is commonly referred to as the Old Steeple by locals.

During the war between Scotland and England known as the Rough Wooing, Dundee and Broughty Castle were occupied by English forces. In January 1548, an English commander, Thomas Wyndham placed a garrison of 20 "tall men" in the steeple, with the help of Andrew Dudley and the Scottish Lord Gray. Their armaments included cannon described as "a saker and a falcon and four double bases" and small guns called "hackbuts of crook".

== Ministers ==
The former minister (2000–2013) was the Rev. David M. Clark, who retired. The present minister (2014–) is the Rev. Robert Calvert.

== See also ==
- List of Church of Scotland parishes
