= Rough Wooing =

16th-century war between Scotland and England

- Part of the Italian War of 1542–1546 and the Anglo-Scottish Wars
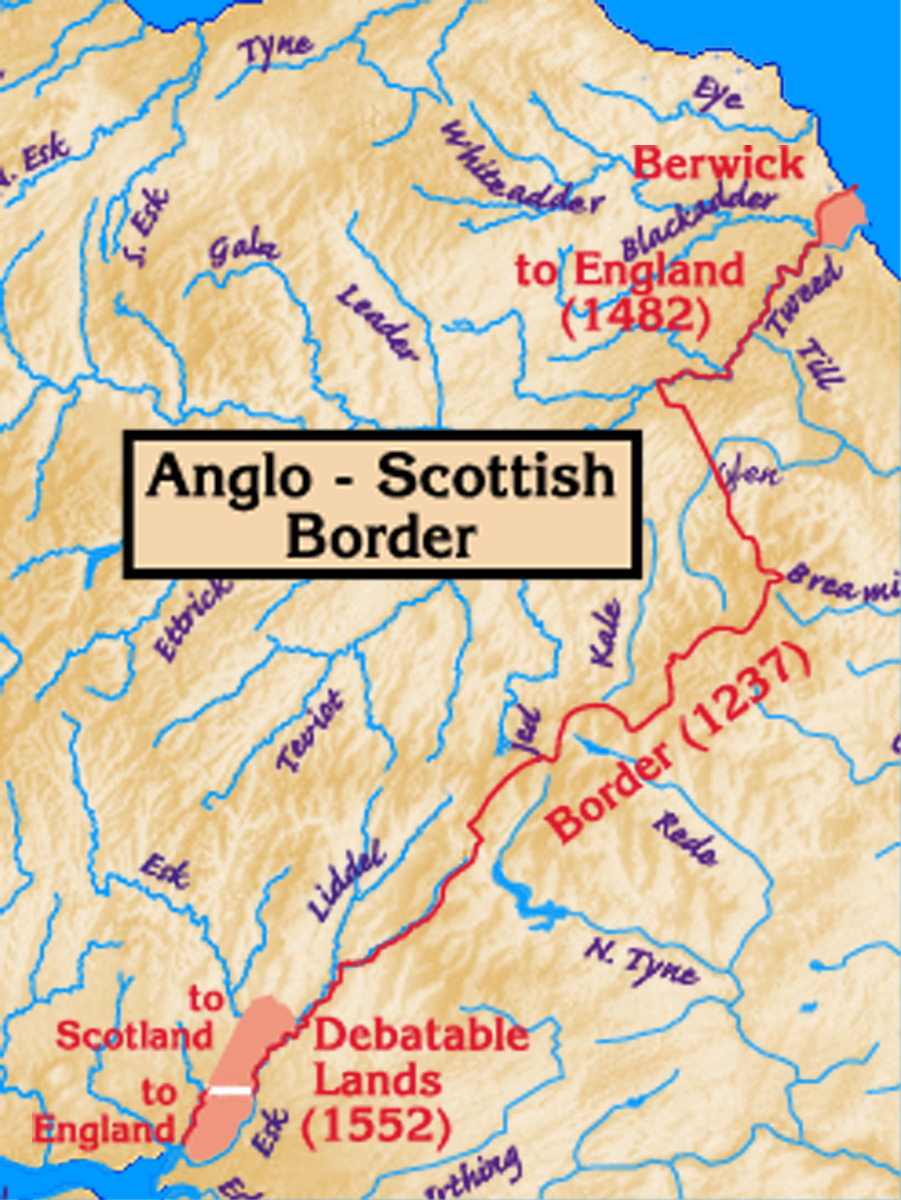
- Anglo-Scottish border at the time of the Rough Wooing
Date	December 1543 – March 1551
Location	northern Britain, mainly Scottish Lowlands
Result	Franco-Scottish victory: Treaty of Norham

Belligerents
Scotland; France	England

Commanders and leaders
Mary of Guise; Earl of Arran; Adam Otterburn	Henry VIII (Note: Henry VIII died in 1547.); Lord Hertford, later Duke of Somerset; Earl of Shrewsbury; Viscount Lisle, Lord Admiral

The Rough Wooing (Scottish Gaelic: An t-Suirghe Chnaparra; December 1543 – March 1551), also known as the Eight Years' War, was part of the Anglo-Scottish Wars of the 16th century. Following the English Reformation, the break from the Catholic Church, England attacked Scotland, partly to break the Auld Alliance and prevent Scotland being used as a springboard for a future invasion by France, partly to weaken Scotland, and partly to force the Scottish Parliament to confirm the existing marriage alliance between Mary, Queen of Scots (born 8 December 1542), and the English heir apparent Edward (born 12 October 1537), son of King Henry VIII, under the terms of the Treaty of Greenwich of July 1543. An invasion of France was also contemplated.

Henry declared war to force the Scottish Parliament to agree to the planned marriage between Edward, who was six years old at the start of the war, and the infant queen, thereby creating a new alliance between Scotland and England. Upon Edward's accession to the throne in 1547 at the age of nine, the war continued for a time under the direction of the Lord High Treasurer, the Duke of Somerset, before Somerset's removal from power in 1549 and replacement by the Duke of Northumberland, who wished for a less costly foreign policy than his predecessor. It was the last major conflict between Scotland and England before the Union of the Crowns in 1603.

== Naming the war ==
In Scotland, the war was called the "Eight" or "Nine Years' War". The idea of the war as a "wooing" was popularised many years later by Sir Walter Scott, and hides the extreme nature of the war. The phrase "Rough Wooing" appeared in several history books from the 1850s onwards.

The phrase appears to derive from a famous remark attributed to George Gordon, 4th Earl of Huntly by Patrick Abercromby in his edition of Jean de Beaugué's history of the war: "We liked not the manner of the wooing, and we could not stoop to being bullied into love", or as William Patten reported, "I lyke not thys wooyng." The historian William Ferguson contrasted this jocular nickname with the savagery and devastation of the war,

English policy was simply to pulverise Scotland, to beat her either into acquiescence or out of existence, and Hertford's campaigns resemble nothing so much as Nazi total warfare; "blitzkrieg", reign of terror, extermination of all resisters, the encouragement of collaborators, and so on.

More recently, Marcus Merriman titled his book The Rough Wooings to emphasise the division of the conflict into two or three distinct phases. Historians including Lorna Hutson and Amy Blakeway object to the name as a "joking diminutive" which diminishes and trivialises the conflict.

== From Solway Moss to Ancrum ==
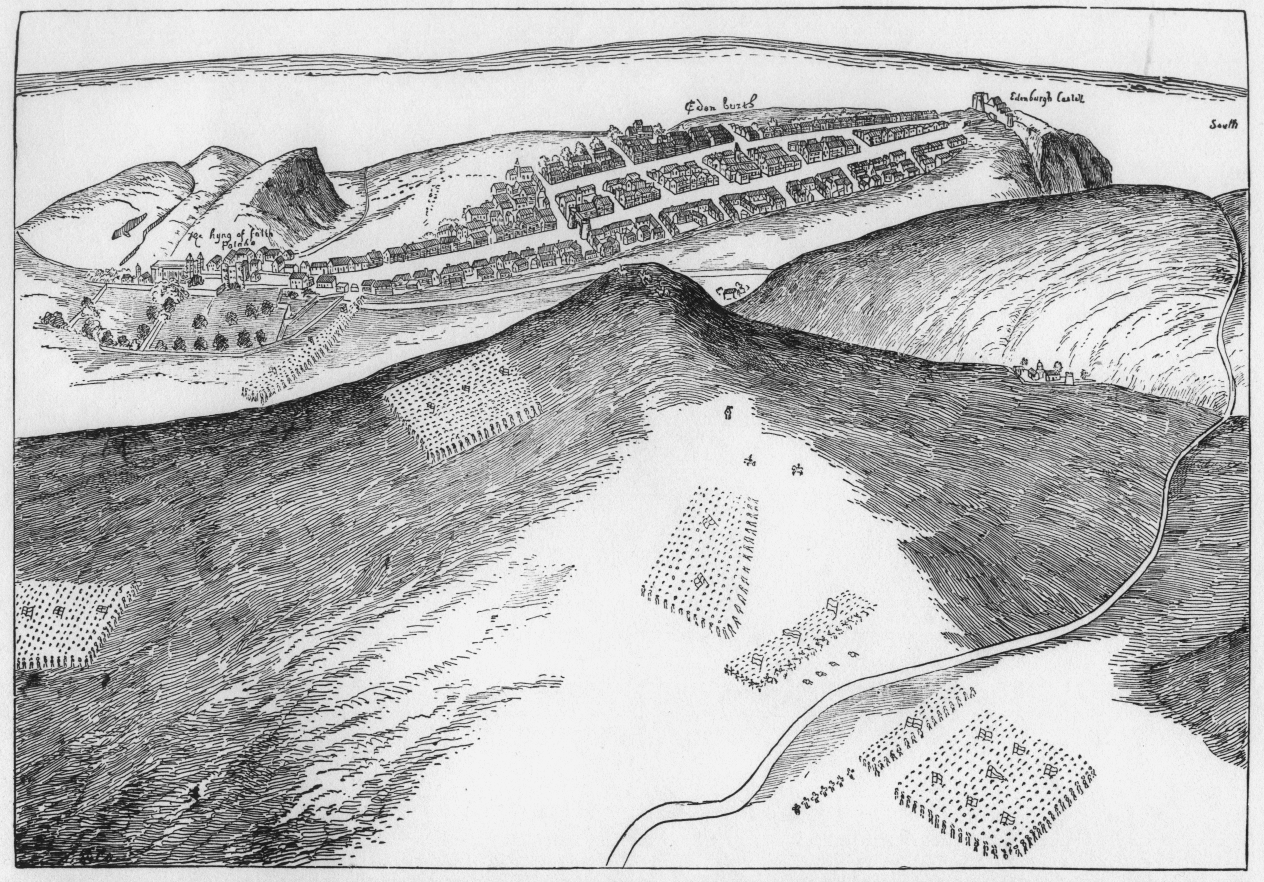
Facsimile of a contemporary sketch showing the deployment of Hertford's forces before they burnt Edinburgh in May 1544

In November 1542, a Scottish army suffered a crushing defeat at the Battle of Solway Moss and James V died soon after. He was succeeded by his six-day-old daughter, Mary, Queen of Scots. A plan for an English marriage for Mary proposed by the Treaty of Greenwich was conditionally accepted by the Scottish government led by Regent Arran. However, Arran was slow to advance the marriage due to strong internal factions favouring an alternative alliance with France and the continuance of the Catholic religion in Scotland. The English diplomat Ralph Sadler reported Adam Otterburn's comment on the Scottish opinion of the marriage:

Our people do not like of it. And though the Governor and some of the nobility have consented to it, yet I know that few or none of them do like of it; and our common people do utterly mislike of it. I pray you give me leave to ask you a question: if your lad was a lass, and our lass were a lad, would you then be so earnest in this matter? ... And lykewise I assure you that our nation will never agree to have an Englishman king of Scotland. And though the whole nobility of the realm would consent, yet our common people, and the stones in the street would rise and rebel against it.

The French-leaning faction of Cardinal Beaton met at Linlithgow in July 1543 to oppose Regent Arran, and signed the "Secret Bond" against the marriage. Mary and her mother, Mary of Guise, moved from Linlithgow Palace to the security of Stirling Castle. Regent Arran celebrated the Treaty of Greenwich at Holyrood Abbey on 25 August 1543. A kind of civil war continued with the Regent opposed by the Douglas faction in the east and Matthew Stewart, 4th Earl of Lennox in the west, with the Battle of Glasgow. In November 1543, Regent Arran besiged Alexander Drummond and members of the Douglas family at the Castle of Dalkeith because of "their affection to England".

The Scots faced the anger of Henry VIII, after the Parliament of Scotland renounced the Treaty of Greenwich on 15 December 1543. The reason given was that English ships had attacked Scottish merchants. On 20 December, war was declared in Edinburgh by the messenger Henry Ray, Berwick Pursuivant. Henry VIII released some Scottish noblemen who had been captured at the Battle of Solway Moss on licence, hoping they would build consensus for the royal marriage. In March 1544, Henry sent Richmond Herald to the Privy Council of Scotland to demand their return.

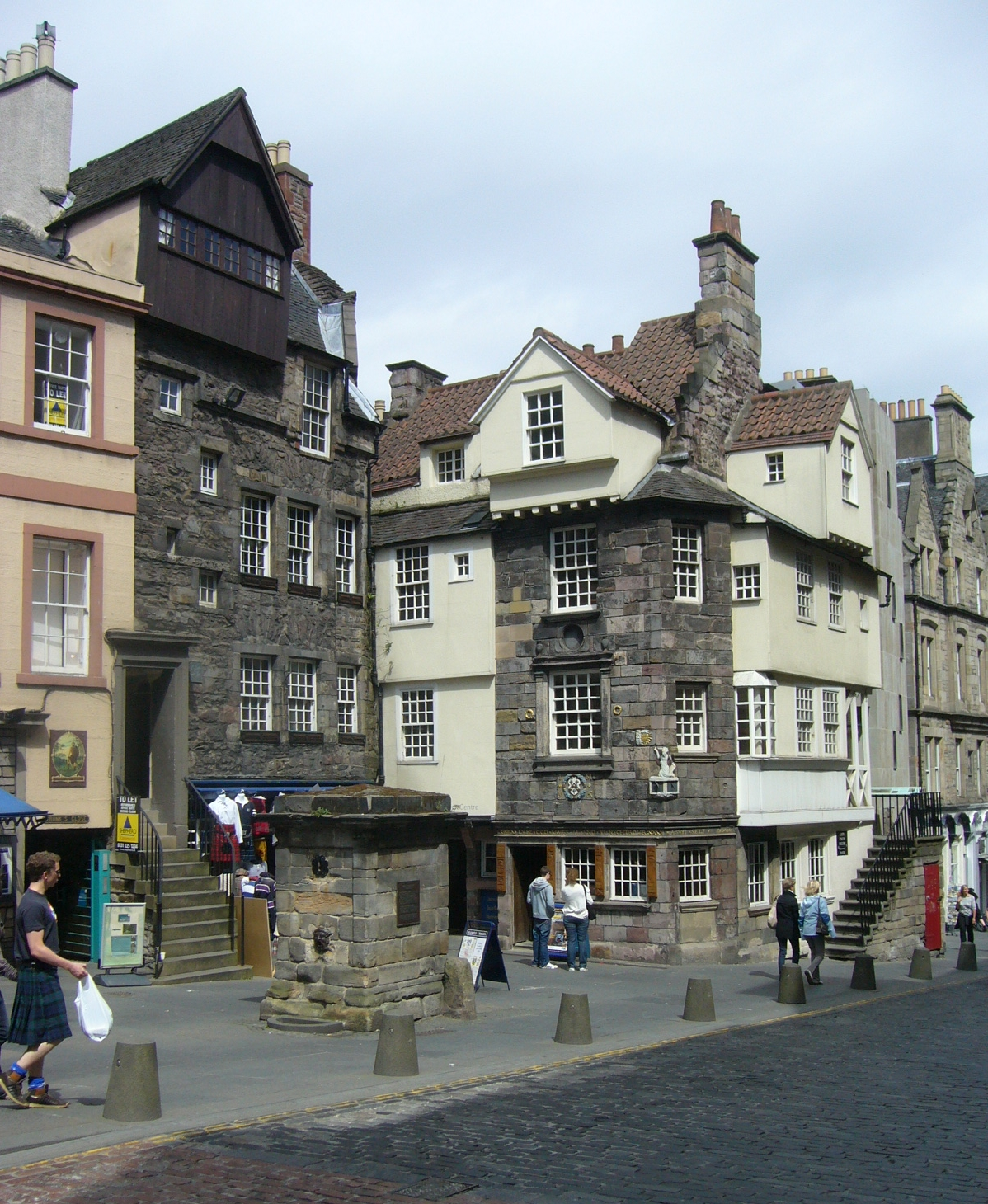
Surviving buildings in the Old Town of Edinburgh

Major hostilities began with an attack on Edinburgh on 3 May 1544, led by the Earl of Hertford and Viscount Lisle. Hertford had instructions to burn Edinburgh and issue Henry's proclamation of 24 March 1544, which laid the blame on Cardinal Beaton's "sinister enticement" of Regent Arran. Hertford considered establishing an English garrison at Leith but the English Privy Council vetoed this plan. Henry VIII also asked him to destroy St Andrews, but Hertford pointed out the extra distance would be troublesome. After burning St Monans on the north side of the Firth of Forth and taking fishing boats for landing-craft, the English army landed at Granton, then occupied Leith. Hertford parleyed with Adam Otterburn, the Provost of Edinburgh, but he had been instructed not to make terms or accept a surrender. The next day the troops entered Edinburgh's Canongate, and set the city on fire. Edinburgh Castle was defended by cannon fire commanding the Royal Mile. Hertford decided not to lay siege but thoroughly burn the city. According to the English contemporary account, all the houses within the suburbs and city walls were burnt including Holyroodhouse and the Abbey. The English ships at Leith were loaded with looted goods and sailed with the captured Unicorn and Salamander. The army returned to England by land, burning towns and villages along the way.

Soon after the English force had landed, Regent Arran released the Earl of Angus and George Douglas of Pittendreich who had been imprisoned in Blackness Castle. Although they had been supporters of the English marriage, Arran now needed the support of Clan Douglas against an English invasion. Following this attack, Sir William Eure and Ralph Eure made raids across the border from Berwick upon Tweed, burning houses and buying the loyalty of Scots who became "assured men".

Arran's power struggle against Mary of Guise led to internal conflicts. In September 1544, John, 5th Lord Borthwick, an ally of Arran, was captured and held at Dalkeith Castle by George Douglas. His wife, Isobel Lindsay, Lady Borthwick, invited Patrick Hepburn, 3rd Earl of Bothwell to Borthwick Castle and imprisoned him there until her husband was released in an exchange. A spy told William Eure that Bothwell came to the castle because "the Lady Borthwick is fair, he came to her for love, but she made him to be handled and kept". Thomas Wharton heard that Bothwell was invited to a newly-built lodging outside the castle, where he was taken by Gavin Borthwick.

Against these English invasions, the Scots won a victory at the Battle of Ancrum Moor in February 1545. Scotland was included in the Treaty of Camp, or Treaty of Ardres, of 6 June 1546, which concluded the Italian War of 1542–1546. This brought 18 months of peace between England and Scotland. In May 1546, Fife lairds had murdered the Francophile Cardinal Beaton at St Andrews Castle. These Protestant lairds became known as the Castilians, and garrisoned the castle against Regent Arran, hoping for English military support.

== Pinkie to the peace ==
Henry VIII died in January 1547 and the war continued under the Lord Protector Somerset for Edward VI. A Scottish diplomat in London, Adam Otterburn, described new preparations for war against the Scots. The English had established a fort at Langholm in the Scottish borders; unable to secure its return by diplomacy, Regent Arran reduced it by force on 17 July 1547 following an unsuccessful attempt in June. At the same time, a French naval force took St Andrews Castle from the Castilians. On 24 July Arran ordered seven signal beacons to be prepared to warn of an expected English invasion by sea. The first was at St Abb's Head, the second at Dowhill near Fast Castle, next on the Doun Law near Spott, North Berwick Law, 'Dounprenderlaw', at Arthur's Seat or Edinburgh Castle, and at 'Binning's Craig' near Linlithgow. The keepers of these 'bailes' were instructed to have horsemen ready to carry news of the invasion to the next beacon if it came in daylight. The towns of Lothian, the borders and the Forth valley were ordered to ensure that all men between sixty and sixteen living in sight of the beacons were ready to respond to the signal.

An English invasion in September 1547 won a major encounter at the Battle of Pinkie close to Musselburgh, and put much of southern Scotland under military occupation. Haddington was occupied, along with Broughty Castle near Dundee. Beginning on 5 April 1548, Sir Robert Bowes built a fort at Lauder. Increased French military support for the Scots included the services of military engineers like Migliorino Ubaldini who strengthened Edinburgh Castle and Dunbar. An English commander William Grey, 13th Baron Grey de Wilton burnt Musselburgh on 9 June 1548 and Dunbar on 12 June. On 16 June 10,000 French troops arrived at Leith, and besieged Haddington with artillery.

Following the Treaty of Haddington, Mary was taken to safety in France in August 1548 and betrothed to the Dauphin Francis. Piero Strozzi began to fortify Leith with 300 Scottish workmen. Strozzi had been shot in the leg at Haddington and was carried around the works in a chair by four men.

With the fortification of Dunglass, English commanders including Thomas Holcroft began to write of the "King's Pale" in Scotland, anticipating that Edward VI would receive feudal rents from the occupied area of Southern Scotland, extending from Dunglass to Berwick, and Lauder to Dryburgh. Landowners would be replaced by Scottish "assured men" or English men.

By May 1549, the English army on the frontier included 3,200 soldiers with 1,700 German and 500 Spanish and Italian mercenaries. With more financial and military assistance from France brought by Paul de Thermes, the Scots were able to maintain resistance. André de Montalembert, sieur d'Essé, captured the island of Inchkeith on 19 June 1549.

== Treaty of Boulogne ==
The English abandoned Haddington on 19 September 1549. Hostilities ended with Scotland comprehended in the Treaty of Boulogne of 24 March 1550, which was primarily between France and England. Peace was declared in England on Saturday 29 March 1550; a week earlier the Privy Council had sent secret orders to English commanders telling them not to move cannon that would be abandoned to the Scots.

Conditions of the peace included the return of prisoners and the demolition and slighting of border fortifications. As part of the treaty, six French and English hostages or pledges were to be exchanged on 7 April. These were, for France: Mary of Guise's brother, the Marquis de Mayenne; Louis de la Trémoille; Jean de Bourbon, Comte d'Enghien; François de Montmorency; Jean d'Annebaut, son of the Admiral of France; François de Vendôme, Vidame de Chartres, were sent to London. For England: Henry Brandon; Edward Seymour, 1st Earl of Hertford; George Talbot; John Bourchier, 5th Baron FitzWarren; Henry Fitzalan; Henry Stanley.

Francois de Seguenville-Fumel, sieur de Thors, brought the peace treaty and ratifications to Scotland in April 1550. Mary of Guise and Regent Arran gave De Thors a gold chain, made by the Edinburgh goldsmith John Mosman.

The hostages at both courts were well entertained and most had returned home by August 1550. In France, Henry II organised a triumphal entry to Rouen on 1 October 1550. Mary of Guise and Mary, Queen of Scots took part. There were banners depicting the French victories in Scotland; and a herald recited:

Voila Dondy, Edimpton, Portugray,
Où Termes prist & Essé le degrè,
Pour devenir chevalier de ton ordre.
Sire, voyez ceste Ysle de Chevaulx,
Voyez aussy le fort chasteau de Fargues,
O quants assaulx, escarmouches & cargues,
Voila aussi le fort pres de Donglass,
Et plus deca ou est assis ce bourg,
Est le chasteau conquis de Rossebourg.

Translation:

Here are Dundee, Haddington, Broughty Craig,
Where de Thermes, with d'Essé,
became knights of your order.
Sire, see Inchkeith,
Also see strong Fast Castle,
So much assault, skirmish and hassle,
Here also close to Dunglass,
Further the side where sits the burgh
the castle conquered is Roxburgh.

A separate peace negotiation between Scotland and the Holy Roman Empire was required, chiefly so that trade and piracy disputes could be resolved. In August 1550, Regent Arran taxed forty of the chief trading burghs of Scotland to fund an embassy to Charles V. This treaty was concluded in Antwerp by Thomas, Master of Erskine, on 1 May 1551. The Treaty of Norham in 1551 formally ended the war and the English military presence withdrew from Scotland.

An Act of the Parliament of Scotland made on 11 September 1551 addressed the need to rebuild in Edinburgh and other burgh towns (such as Dundee) which had been extensively damaged during the war and "burnt by the old enemies of England." In October 1551, Mary of Guise herself was welcomed in England and she travelled from Portsmouth to meet Edward VI in London.

== Treaty of Norham ==
The peace, concluded at Norham Castle and church on 10 June 1551, was negotiated by Thomas Erskine, Master of Erskine, Lord Maxwell, Sir Robert Carnegie of Kinnaird, and Robert Reid, Bishop of Orkney with the seigneur de Lansac, representing Henry II of France. The English delegation included Sir Robert Bowes, Sir Leonard Beckwith, Sir Thomas Challoner and Richard Sampson, Bishop of Lichfield and Coventry. The terms included: the English abandoning their holdings in Scotland; the border and Debatable Lands to revert to original lines and usage; Edrington and fishing rights on the Tweed returned to Scotland; all captives, pledges, and hostages to be returned. Edward VI ratified the treaty on 30 June and Mary on 14 August 1551.

== Propaganda war ==
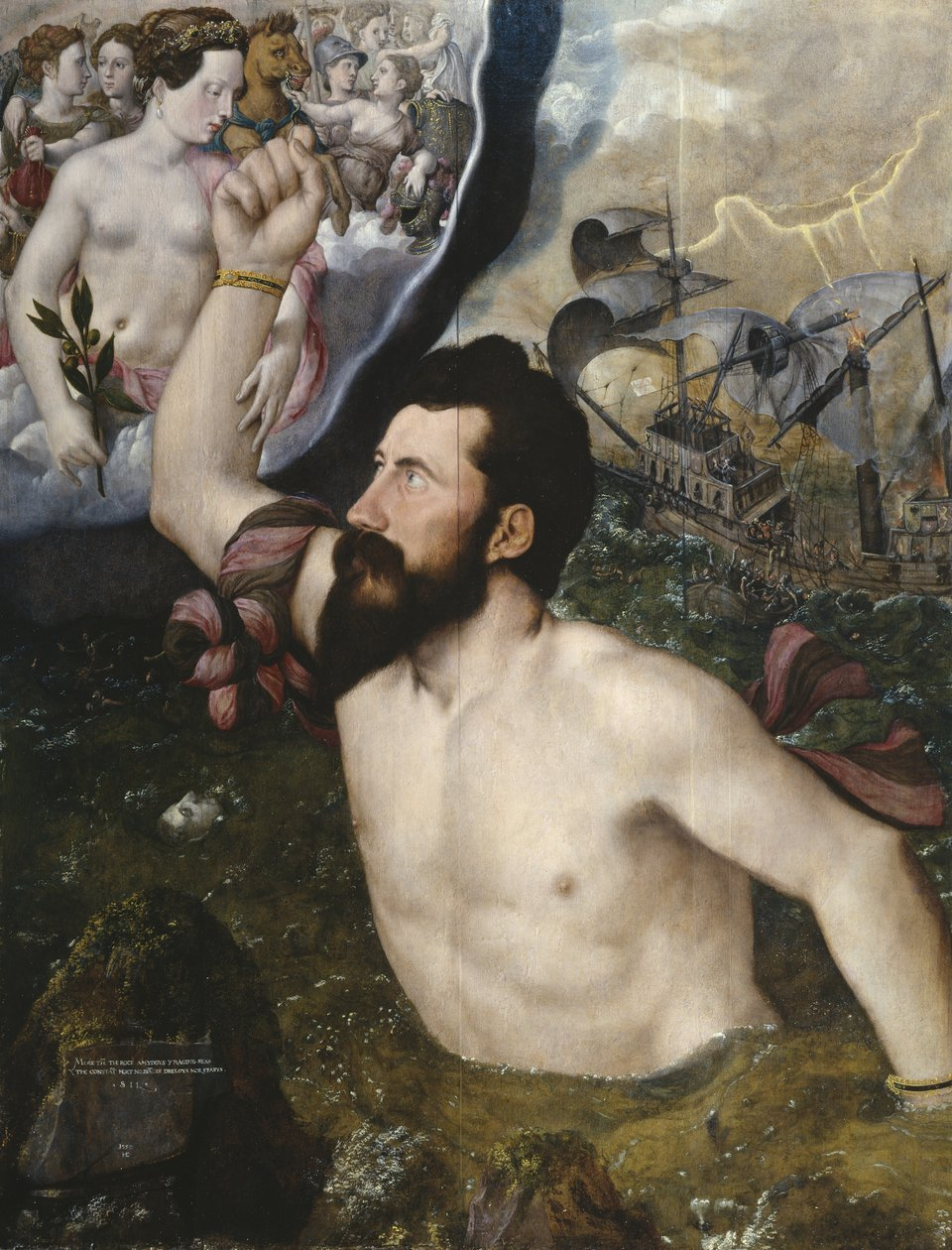
Sir John Luttrell, English commander at Inchcolm and Broughty Castle

The English objective to forward a union between Scotland and England had wavering support among some sectors of the Scots population. These Scots may not have relished French domination of Scottish affairs or may have seen the alliance with England as furthering the Protestant cause. A number of books and pamphlets were published in England as propaganda to encourage such feelings. They focused on three aspects of the conflict: long-standing debates about the rights of the English crown in Scotland, the perceived injustice of the Scottish rejection of the Treaty of Greenwich, and the merit of the Protestant religion. The English commander at Broughty, Andrew Dudley, hoped to distribute Bibles printed in English, which were not freely available in Scotland. Scotland countered the English propaganda with the Complaynt of Scotland, probably printed in France in 1549. Another work, Ane Resonyng by William Lamb, did not make it to the press.

The first English work was written before the Battle of Solway Moss: A Declaration, conteyning the iust causes and consyderations, of this present warre with the Scottis, wherein alsoo appereth the trewe & right title, that the kings most royall maiesty hath to the soveraynitie of Scotlande. A journal of Hertford's raid on Edinburgh of 1544 was printed as The Late expedicion of the Earl of Hertford into Scotland. A contribution by a Scot in England, John Elder, remained unpublished. It was intended to preface a detailed description and map of Scotland. Elder claimed that the northern lords of Scotland, who were 'red-shanks' of Irish descent, would be loyal to Henry VIII, and reject the French culture imposed by Cardinal Beaton and the Scottish court. (Elder later became the tutor of Lord Darnley.)

Somerset began a new round in 1547 shortly before the Battle of Pinkie by publishing the Scot James Henrisoun's An Exhortacion to the Scottes to conforme themselfes to the honourable, Expedient & godly Union betweene the two realmes of Englande & Scotland. It was followed by Somerset's printed Proclamation of 4 September 1547, and the Epistle or Exhortation of February 1548. The Pinkie campaign was described by William Patten in The Expedition into Scotland of the most worthy Prince, Edward Duke of Somerset, printed by Richard Grafton in 1548.

A Welshman, Nicholas Bodrugan, contributed his Epitome of the title of the kynges majestie of Englande, which looks back to Geoffrey of Monmouth to justify English claims and seeks to reassure Scottish fears that the civil law of England was harsher than Scots law. David Lindsay's poem The Tragedy of the Cardinal was published in London with an account of the death of George Wishart, with a preface encouraging religious reform by Robert Burrant. In October 1548, Sir John Mason and other clerks were rewarded £20 for their archival researches into "records of matters of Scotland" for these tracts.

Lord Methven understood the effect of the English propaganda and raised his concern with Mary of Guise in June 1548. The Protestant Fife lairds who had killed David Beaton and held the Regent's son, James Hamilton hostage at St Andrews Castle gambled on English assistance. In East Lothian, three friends of the Protestant preacher George Wishart, John Cockburn of Ormiston, Ninian Cockburn, and Alexander Crichton of Brunstane lent their support to England. Lord Gray and the Master of Ruthven were also happy to deal with the English.

Other Scots were induced to sign bonds and take payments from the English and became "assured men". A sample bond for assurance was drafted by a Scot, Henry Balnaves, at St Andrews Castle in December 1546. That mostly happened in the war zones of the border and around English garrisons. After the war ended, many Scots were accused of assurance or collaboration as a crime; 192 citizens of Dundee were acquitted in 1553, and the whole town of Dumfries received a pardon. In July 1549 with English losses in France the assurance system ceased. Henrisoun, observing recent developments, questioned "Whether it were better to conquer hearts without charges, or burn, and build forts at great charges, which will never conquer Scotland?"

At the end of the war, the French celebrated their successful intervention at fêtes like the entry to Rouen. The details of these events were published in illustrated festival books. In England a number of the English commanders had their portraits painted celebrating their martial prowess, including John Luttrell, James Wilford, Thomas Wyndham, and a picture (now lost) was made to commemorate Edward Shelley who was killed in action at Pinkie. Exploits during the siege of Haddington were later celebrated by the Elizabethan author Ulpian Fulwell in 1575.
