= Patrick Gray, 4th Lord Gray =

Scottish landowner and Sheriff of Angus

Patrick Gray, 4th Lord Gray (c. 1518 -1584) was a Scottish landowner and Sheriff of Angus, active during the war of the Rough Wooing as a supporter of the Scottish Reformation.

== Family ==
Patrick Gray was the son of Egidia Mercer and Gilbert Gray of Buttergask (half-brother of Patrick Gray, 3rd Lord Gray), and the grandson of Andrew Gray, 2nd Lord Gray (d. 1514). Patrick became Lord Gray in April 1541, after the death of his uncle. In order to succeed to the Gray lands, as heir of his grandfather, he had to pay 10,000 marks to the Treasury of King James V of Scotland, and was confirmed Lord Gray on 14 September 1542. He was still paying James Hamilton, Regent Arran, in 1543.

Patrick Gray firstly married Marion Ogilvy in 1537. Their son was Patrick Gray, 5th Lord Gray (1538–1608). Their daughter Elizabeth Gray married Laurence Bruce of Cultmalindie, who moved to Shetland and built Muness Castle on Unst.

Patrick secondly married Margaret Ker, daughter of Sir Walter Ker of Cessford, in 1557. The chief residence of the Grays was Fowlis Castle, near Dundee, Scotland, and they also lived as well at Castle Huntly, nearby. In 1583, an English list of the Scottish nobility described Patrick with an interesting but inaccurate English pedigree;

"an aged man, esteemed to come of English bloode, that came into Scotlande with the Lady Somerset, wyef to King James the Firste. In religion suspected; of no greate power or frendes. His eldest sonne married th'erle of Gowrie's father's sister, and his other the daughter of Lord Glamis."

== Rough Wooing ==
Lord Gray was captured by the English at the Battle of Solway Moss and was held by the Archbishop of York. When he returned to Scotland he made a band of friendship or 'manrent' with Cardinal David Beaton at St Andrews on 22 October 1544.

On 11 March 1547, during the siege at St Andrews Castle, Gray made a pledge to Edward VI. This contract stated that for English assistance in re-instating his rights over Perth, and the return of his brother, who was a hostage (called a "pledge" in the language of the time) in England; Patrick Gray would further the marriage of Mary, Queen of Scots to Edward VI, and deliver Broughty Castle and the Spey Tower at Perth to the English army. This instrument was witnessed by Norman Leslie, James Kirkcaldy of Grange, Henry Balnaves, and Alexander Whitelaw of Newgrange.

Gray asked to be compensated for his fishing rights at Broughty; he was duly paid £1000 on 14 November 1547 by Sir Andrew Dudley, an English soldier and brother of the Duke of Northumberland. At the same time, the Master of Ruthven, whose father was Provost of Perth and Gray's rival, offered to deliver Perth to the English. In June 1548, Thomas Fisher brought him the Lord Protector's thanks, a gold chain, a pension of 1000 crowns and a gift of 300 crowns.

In January 1548, an English commander, Thomas Wyndham, placed a garrison of 20 "tall men" in the Steeple at Dundee, with the help and advice of Andrew Dudley and Lord Gray. Their armaments included cannon described as "a saker and a falcon and four double bases" and small guns called "hackbuts of crook".

Gray made a compromise with Mary of Guise in March 1548, promising to serve her and Mary, Queen of Scots and accepting a pension of 500 merks.

Gray was captured by French troops in November 1548 and summoned for treason on 18 December 1548. D'Essé, the French commander, wanted him executed, but Regent Arran and the other Scottish lords protested. Gray was imprisoned for a time at Blackness Castle. His wife Marion petitioned Mary of Guise for his release.

== Later life ==
During the crisis of the Scottish Reformation, Mary of Guise wrote to Lord Gray on 11 May 1560 to inform him of the defeat of an English assault at the Siege of Leith. In August 1560, Lord Gray attended the Scottish Reformation Parliament, and signed the commission for the marriage of James Hamilton, 3rd Earl of Arran to Elizabeth I, (which had no effect). Some years before, Gray had been captured by the English at a border incident called the Raid of Swinton. In 1562 he was detained in England, on account of his old bail conditions – he had been, "lattin hame upoun ane band." Mary, Queen of Scots, wrote to Elizabeth to complain at his ill-treatment.

Preceded by Patrick Gray, 3rd Lord Gray	Lord Gray; 1541–1584	Succeeded by Patrick Gray, 5th Lord Gray
