= James Kirkcaldy =

16th-century Scottish Protestant nobleman

Sir James Kirkcaldy of Grange (died 1556), a Fife laird and treasurer of Scotland. He married Janet Melville, aunt of Sir James Melville of Halhill. Their heir was William Kirkcaldy of Grange. His main property was called Hallyards Castle. The name is sometimes spelled Kirkaldy.

== Treasury business ==
Sir James Kirkcaldy accompanied James V on his trip to France in 1536 to marry Madeleine of Valois. His duties included paying the sailors and organising repairs to the ships for the return voyage. On 13 October 1537, Janet and James received a gift of lands at Kinghorn from the king, taken from John Lyon, 7th Lord Glamis.

James Kirkcaldy signed an audit of an account of royal income in 1538. On 4 October 1539, James V granted him the fishing rights on the Tay at Tentsmuir both fresh and saltwater.

In February 1540 James V requested the auditors of the accounts to reward Kirkcaldy and the comptroller David Wood of the Craig. As their twelve servants had to attend court but would not be housed and fed as household men in the newly reformed royal household, Wood and Kirkcaldy each got £333-6s-8d each yearly. Kirkcaldy also got extra payments, to "sustain the treasurer's house", when the exchequer followed the king on justice ayres; to Dumbarton in 1540, and Dumfries in 1541.

Kirkcaldy witnessed King James's will on the Salamander at Leith on 12 June 1540 before his voyage to Orkney and the Western Isles.

== Against persecution ==
George Buchanan mentions Kirkcaldy's Protestant faith in his account of the arrest and execution of James Hamilton of Finnart. James Melville of Halhill credits Kirkcaldy with a lengthy speech to James V which narrates the events of the king's early years. According to Melville and John Knox, the Catholic clergy had given James V a list of all the Protestants in Scotland, hoping the king would persecute them and seize their lands. James Kirkcaldy, in Melville's story, by his speech persuaded the king not to do this. James V confronted the clergy with his dagger saying; "Wherefore gave my predecessors so many lands and rents to the kirk? Was it to maintain hawks, dogs and whores to a number of idle priests?" But now the priests knew the king's intentions, and when Kirkcaldy was away from court, securing the marriage of his second son to Helen Leslie of Pitcaple, his enemies at court moved against him. Melville thought these courtiers persuaded James V against travelling to York to meet Henry VIII, who hoped that Scotland would become a Protestant country. The breaking of this arrangement was thought to have led to the Battle of Solway Moss. John Knox told the same story in his History of the Reformation. Regent Arran mentioned the king's list of 360 Protestants to Ralph Sadler in March 1543.

On 25 October 1542, the king confirmed Janet and James in possession of their lands at Grange. After the death of James V, as treasurer of Scotland, Kirkcaldy ratified the Treaty of Greenwich on 25 August 1543.

== Within St Andrews Castle ==
James Kirkcaldy joined the Protestant Fife Lairds who killed David Beaton then held St Andrews Castle against Regent Arran. In February or March 1547 James joined with other lairds in the Castle to witness Patrick, Lord Gray's pledge to Edward VI. The other witnesses on 11 March 1547 were; Norman Leslie, Master of Rothes; Henry Balnaves of Halhill; Alexander Whitelaw of Newgrange. A French fleet came and took the castle. James Kirkcaldy was taken to France as a prisoner with Norman Leslie, Henry Balnaves, Henry Moneypenny and others. The lairds and John Knox were eventually released.

== Family ==
James and his younger brothers George, John and Patrick are all described as "familiar servants of the king", courtiers, in a Great Seal letter. On 19 October 1539 the brothers were forgiven for not joining James V on an excursion to Solway and for their connivance in the murder of three Fife lairds.

The most famous of James Kirkcaldy's children was the soldier-statesman Sir William Kirkcaldy of Grange, who fought for the Protestant lords during the reformation, and accepted the surrender of the Queen of Scots at Carberry Hill in 1567. He later regretted his role in her defeat and held Edinburgh Castle in her name, until it fell in 1573 and he was executed.

His daughters:

- Marjory, who was gentlewoman in the household of Mary of Guise, married Harry Ramsay younger of Colluthie.
- Agnes, married Robert Drummond of Carnock, Master of Work to the Crown of Scotland.
- Marian, married William Sempill of Cathcart.
- Elspeth or Elizabeth Kirkcaldy, who married John Mowbray of Barnbougle Castle.
