= List of acts of the Parliament of Scotland from 1545 =

This is a list of acts of the Parliament of Scotland for the year 1545.

It lists acts of Parliament of the old Parliament of Scotland, that was merged with the old Parliament of England to form the Parliament of Great Britain, by the Union with England Act 1707 (c. 7).

For other years, see list of acts of the Parliament of Scotland. For the period after 1707, see list of acts of the Parliament of Great Britain.

== 1545 ==
The 3rd parliament of Mary, held in Linlithgow and Stirling from 28 September 1545 until 12 August 1546.

Short title, or popular name	Citation	Royal assent
Long title
Defence of the Realm Act 1545 (repealed)	1545 c. 1 (Note: This is the citation in the Record Edition.) — (Note: This act is not listed in the Duodecimal Edition.)	2 October 1454
Of thame that sittis under assurance of the king of Ingland (Note: King Henry VIII of England.) now in tyme of weir. Of those that sit under assurance of the king of England, now in time of war. (Repealed by Statute Law Revision (Scotland) Act 1906 (6 Edw. 7. c. 38))
Defence of the Realm (No. 2) Act 1545 (repealed)	1545 c. 2 —	2 October 1454
Anent the laying of gerneissons on the bordouris. Regarding the laying of garrisons on the borders. (Repealed by Statute Law Revision (Scotland) Act 1906 (6 Edw. 7. c. 38))
Defence of the Realm (No. 3) Act 1545 (repealed)	1545 c. 3 —	2 October 1454
Of ane taxt of sextene thowsand pund for the furnessing of horsmen. Of a tax of sixteen thousand pounds for the furnishing of horsemen. (Repealed by Statute Law Revision (Scotland) Act 1906 (6 Edw. 7. c. 38))
Defence of the Realm (No. 4) Act 1545 (repealed)	1545 cc. 4–5 —	5 October 1454
Anentis the deviding laying and ordouring of the horsmen apoun the bordouris. Regardin gthe dividing, laying and ordering of the horsemen upon the borders. (Repealed by Statute Law Revision (Scotland) Act 1906 (6 Edw. 7. c. 38))
Defence of the Realm (No. 5) Act 1545 (repealed)	1545 c. 6 —	5 October 1454
Anent payment of the restis of the last taxt of xxvi fi. Regarding payment of the rest of the last tax of £26,000. (Repealed by Statute Law Revision (Scotland) Act 1906 (6 Edw. 7. c. 38))
Queen's Person Act 1545 (repealed)	1545 c. 7 —	5 October 1454
Tuiching the lordis that tuik upoun thame the keiping of our soverane ladeis persoun. Touching the lords that took upon them the keeping of our sovereign lady's person. (Repealed by Statute Law Revision (Scotland) Act 1906 (6 Edw. 7. c. 38))
Defence of the Realm (No. 6) Act 1545 (repealed)	1545 c. 8 —	6 October 1454
Anent the inbringin of the taxt. Regarding the collection of the tax. (Repealed by Statute Law Revision (Scotland) Act 1906 (6 Edw. 7. c. 38))
Defence of the Realm (No. 7) Act 1545 (repealed)	1545 c. 9 —	9 August 1546
Ratificatioun of the act (Note: Act of privy council, made in Stirling on 11 June 1546.) anentis the taking of spirituale men thair houssis and places. Ratification of the act regarding the taking of spiritual men, their houses and places. (Repealed by Statute Law Revision (Scotland) Act 1906 (6 Edw. 7. c. 38))
Defence of the Realm (No. 8) Act 1545 (repealed)	1545 c. 10 —	14 August 1546
Grant be the clergy of ane taxt for the sege of the castell of Sanctandrois. (Note: Siege of St Andrews Castle.); Grant by the clergy of a tax for the siege of the castle of St Andrews. (Repealed by Statute Law Revision (Scotland) Act 1906 (6 Edw. 7. c. 38))
Treaties with England and France Act 1545 (repealed)	1545 c. 11 —	14 August 1546
Anent the acceptance of the comprehensioun maid for this realm in the contract of pece betuix the king of France (Note: King Francis I of France.) and the king of Ingland. Regarding the acceptance of the comprehension made for this realm in the contract of peace between the king of France and the king of England. (Repealed by Statute Law Revision (Scotland) Act 1906 (6 Edw. 7. c. 38))
St. Andrews Castle Act 1545 (repealed)	1545 c. 12 —	14 August 1546
Tuiching my lord Governouris eldest sone withhaldin in the castell of Sanctandrois. Touching my lord Governor's eldest son, held within the castle of St Andrews. (Repealed by Statute Law Revision (Scotland) Act 1906 (6 Edw. 7. c. 38))
Removal of Tenants Act 1545 (repealed)	1545 c. 13; 1546 c. 3 (Note: This is the citation in the Duodecimal Edition.)	14 August 1546
Ratificatioun of the act anentis the laying furth of tennentis be thair oure lordis. Ratification of the act against the laying forth of tenants by their own lords. (Repealed by Statute Law Revision (Scotland) Act 1906 (6 Edw. 7. c. 38))
Royal Marriage Act 1545 (repealed)	1545 c. 14 —	14 August 1546
Ratificatioun of the actis of dissolutioun of the meriage be the lordis that consentit not to the samyn in the first parliament. Ratification of the cats of dissolution of the marriage by the lords that did not consent to the same in the first parliament. (Repealed by Statute Law Revision (Scotland) Act 1906 (6 Edw. 7. c. 38))
Supply Act 1545 (repealed)	1545 c. 15 —	14 August 1546
Anent the ingetting of the contributioun grantit to the sete of sessioun. Regarding the collection of the contribution granted to the seat of session. (Repealed by Statute Law Revision (Scotland) Act 1906 (6 Edw. 7. c. 38))

=== Sources ===
- Alexander, William (1841). "Acta Parliamentorum Mariæ Reginæ". An Abridgement of the Acts of the Parliaments of Scotland. Edinburgh: Adam and Charles Black. p. A18 – via Google Books.
- Alexander, William (1841). "Acta Parliamentorum Mariæ Reginæ". An Abridgement of the Acts of the Parliaments of Scotland. Edinburgh: Adam and Charles Black. p. A18 – via Google Books.
- Chronological Table of the Statutes. London: Her Majesty's Stationery Office. 1972. p. 1331 – via Google Books.
- "Index of Statutes: Mary I (1542-1567)". Records of the Parliaments of Scotland to 1707. University of St Andrews.

== See also ==
- List of legislation in the United Kingdom
- Records of the Parliaments of Scotland
