= Henry Balnaves =

Scottish politician (~1512–1570)

Henry Balnaves (1512? – February 1570) was a Scottish politician, Lord Justice Clerk, and religious reformer.

== Biography ==
Born in Kirkcaldy, Fife, around 1512, he was educated at the University of St Andrews and on the continent, where he adopted Protestant views. Returning to Scotland, he continued his legal studies and in 1538 was appointed a lord of session and Senator of the College of Justice. He signed an audit of an account of royal income in 1538.

He married Christian Scheves and in 1539 was granted the estate of Halhill in Fife, after which he is generally named. Before 1540 he was sworn of James V of Scotland's privy council, and was known as one of the party in favour of the English alliance and of an ecclesiastical reformation. He is also described as treasurer to James. In January 1543, Regent Arran appointed him secretary in the new government of the infant Queen Mary (January 1543).

Balnaves promoted the act permitting the reading of the Scriptures in the vulgar tongue. He was sent to England as a diplomat with James Learmonth of Dairsie in March 1543. They were appointed to arrange a marriage treaty between the little queen and the future Edward VI. He was a commissioner for the Treaty of Greenwich. In London he was not considered so complaisant as some of the other commissioners, and was not made privy to all the engagements taken by his colleagues. However, David Beaton "loved him worst of all," and when Regent Arran went over to the priestly party, Balnaves was deprived of his offices and imprisoned in Blackness Castle in November 1543.

He was released by the arrival of Hertford's fleet in the following May, and from this time he became a paid agent of the English cause in Scotland, receiving an annuity. He took no part in the murder of Cardinal Beaton at St Andrews Castle, but was one of the most active defenders of the castle during the subsequent siege and was English paymaster of the garrison. Balnaves approved the recruitment of John Knox to be their preacher in the castle. In support of Henry VIII's Rough Wooing, he drafted the form of an assurance bond for Scots to support the marriage of Prince Edward and Mary. When St Andrews Castle surrendered to the French in July, Balnaves was taken prisoner to Rouen.

Somerset made vain efforts to procure his release and continued his pension. He made himself useful by giving information to the English government, and even Mary Tudor sent him a reward in June 1554. Balnaves also busied himself in writing what Knox calls "a comfortable treatise of justification," which was found in manuscript at the house of John Cockburn of Ormiston by Knox's secretary Richard Bannatyne and published at Edinburgh in 1584 under the title The Confession of Faith.

In August 1555, Balnaves wrote to Mary of Guise from Paris. She had become Regent of Scotland, and Balnaves offered to support her regime with secret legal advice regarding crown incomes. He expressed confidence in her rule and mentioned she had shown kindness to his wife, Christina Scheves;

"Your Heighnes' maist gentill and gracious clemencie schawin to me, undeservit, and to the pure woman my wiff, quha hes no other help bot your grace, and the hope I have in your heighness, compellis me seik and preis forward to your grace' service, and to pretermit (avoid) na thyng, when occasion is gevin to me, that I can do to your contentation and pleasour."

In February 1557 Balnaves was permitted to return to Scotland and regain his property; probably it was thought that Queen Mary's burnings would have cooled the ardour of his English affections, and that in the war threatening between two Catholic countries, Balnaves would serve his own.

The accession of Queen Elizabeth I changed the situation, and Mary of Guise had reasons for accusing him of "practices out of England". He took, in fact, an active part in the rising of 1559 and was commissioned by the Congregation to solicit the help of the English government through Sir Ralph Sadleir at Berwick. Balnaves was surprised to meet the young Earl of Arran there. He arrived and left secretly by sea from Holy Island. Elizabeth wrote to thank Sir Ralph Sadler and Sir James Croft, Captain of Berwick, personally for their good and diligent service in meeting Balnaves.

He was also selected one of the Scots representatives to negotiate with the Duke of Norfolk in February 1560, arranging the Treaty of Berwick. Balnaves's rehabilitation by letter of Mary, Queen of Scots, in May 1562. In 1563 he was restored to his office as lord of session, and was one of those appointed by the General Assembly to revise the Book of Discipline. He was one of Bothwell's judges for the murder of Darnley in 1567. In October 1568, he accompanied Moray to the York inquiry into Queen Mary's guilt, where they produced the Casket letters.

Balnaves died in 1570 at Leith. He has been claimed as a Scots bard on the strength of one ballad, "O gallandis all, I cry and call," which is printed in Allan Ramsay's Evergreen (2 vols. 1724–1727). His position as Senator of the College of Justice was filled by Thomas McCalzean (Lord Cliftonhall).
