= William Patten (historian) =

English author, scholar and government official

William Patten (c. 1510 – after 1598) was an author, scholar and government official during the reigns of King Edward VI and Queen Elizabeth I.

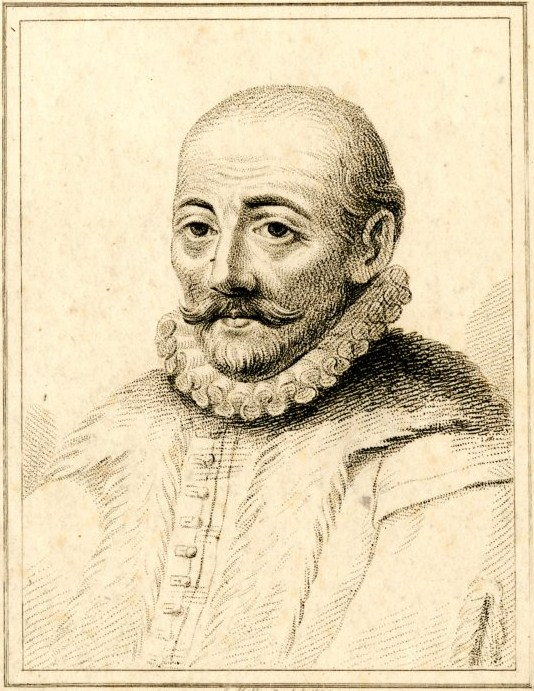
William Patten, 1820 engraving

== Early career ==
William Patten (b. circa 1510 – d. in or after 1598) was born in London, the son of Richard Patten (d. 1536), clothworker, and Grace, the daughter of John Baskerville. His grandfather, Richard Patten of Boslow, Derbyshire, was a brother of William Waynflete (alias Patten), Bishop of Winchester. William Patten's mother, Grace, is said to have predeceased her husband. His sister, Alice (d.1557/8), was the wife of Armagil Waad, whom Patten referred to as a 'friend' in his Expedition into Scotland (see below). Patten is said to have attended Gonville Hall, Cambridge, and from 1528 was a minor chaplain and from 1533 a parish clerk of St Mary-at-Hill, Billingsgate, London.

In 1544 Patten was in France in service as a secretary of the Earl of Arundel. In 1547 he accompanied Somerset's army to Scotland in the capacity of a Judge of the Marshalcy by the appointment of the Earl of Warwick:

[I]t pleased my very good Lord, the Earl of Warwick, Lieutenant of the Host (who thereby had power to make Officers), to make me one of the Judges of the Marshalsy [i.e., in connection with the High Marshal of the Army, Lord Grey], as Master William Cecil now Master of the Requests [and afterwards Lord Burghley] was the other. Whereby, we both (not being bound so straightly, in days of travel, to the order of march; nor otherwhile, but when we sat in Court, to any great affairs) had liberty to ride to see the things that were done, and leisure to note occurrences that came. The which thing, as it chanced, we both did: but so far from appointment between us, as neither was writing of the other’s doing till somewhat before our departure homeward. Marry, since my coming home, indeed, his gentleness being such as to communicate his notes to me, I have, I confess, been thereby, both much a certained [confirmed] in many things I doubted, and somewhat remembered [put in mind] of that which else I might hap to have forgotten.

Patten published his account 'Out of the Parsonage of Saint Mary's Hill, in London, this 28 January 1548' under the title The expedicion into Scotla[n]de of the most woorthely fortunate prince Edward, duke of Soomerset. Patten's narrative of the expedition was largely quoted by Holinshed and was followed by Sir John Hayward in The Life and Raigne of King Edward VI (1630).

In July 1548 Patten was appointed Collector of Customs in London, and in the following year Thomas Penny, prebendary of St. Paul's Cathedral, granted Patten a lease of the manor of Stoke Newington. On 16 April 1565 the lease was renewed for 99 years, to commence from Michaelmas 1576. In 1563 Patten repaired the manor house as well as the Church of St Mary, Stoke Newington, adding a vestry, aisle, private chapel and schoolhouse. Patten was a Justice of the Peace for Middlesex, and in 1558 was appointed Receiver-General of revenues in Yorkshire.

== Financial downfall ==
On 23 June 1562 Patten was appointed for life as a teller of the Exchequer. In Michaelmas term 1567/8, however, his fortunes received a devastating setback. The Auditor of the Receipt of the Exchequer discovered that £7928 was missing from Patten's account. Patten was suspended from his office on 13 January 1568. The Barons of the Exchequer later declared his position forfeit, and he was replaced on 13 July. Over the next few years Patten lost all his other public offices, as well as the lease of Stoke Newington, which he assigned to John Dudley in 1571. On 16 November 1572 Patten presented his 'Supplicatio Patteni' to the Queen, declaring in it that he had had to sell all his lands and belongings to the value of £500 per annum. Patten blamed one of his servants for the sums missing from the Exchequer, and requested an investigation. However there is no evidence that an investigation was ever carried out.

== Literary and scholarly pursuits ==
Deprived of his income and offices, Patten turned to scholarship. In April 1570 he produced a vocabulary and alphabet to accompany an Armenian psalter owned by Archbishop Matthew Parker, the first work in that language in England. His next publication was along similar lines, The calendar of scripture. Whearin the Hebru, Challdian, Arabian, Phenician, Syrian, Persian, Greek and Latin names … in the holly Byble … ar set, and turned into oour English toong (1575). In 1583 Patten produced a metrical translation of Psalm 72, Deus Judicium, and in 1598 a similar translation of Psalm 21, Domine in Virtute. Both were printed as broadsides. Patten also eulogised two former patrons, Henry, Earl of Arundel, whom he had served in France, in a broadside entitled A Moorning Diti (1580), and Sir William Winter, in In mortem W. Wynter (1589). In another eulogy, Luctus consolatorius: super morte nuper D. Cancellarij Angliae (1591), he described himself as a client of Sir Christopher Hatton. Authorship of the Langham letter, a lively description of the Earl of Leicester's entertainment of Queen Elizabeth at Kenilworth Castle in July 1575, has also been attributed to Patten. It is known that Patten contributed verses to the Kenilworth entertainment.

Patten was an early member of the Society of Antiquaries, for which he wrote Of sterling money. John Stow described him as 'a learned Gentleman and grave citizen', and records that Patten 'exhibited a Booke to the Mayor and communalitie' of London protesting against the increase of purprestures (illegal enclosures of land). The translator Thomas Newton praised Patten in verse as a celebrated historian.

Patten's date of death is unknown. The herald and antiquary Francis Thynne mentioned that Patten was 'now living' in 1587. His last known work was published in 1598. An engraving of Patten by J. Mills is found in Robinson's Stoke Newington.

Patten's The Expedition into Scotland is reprinted in Dalyell's Fragments of Scottish History and in Arber's An English Garner.

== Marriages and issue ==
Patten's first wife, whose identity is unknown, died at Billingsgate in 1549. He subsequently married Anne, the daughter of and heiress of Richard Johnson of Boston, Lincolnshire. In The Calendar of Scripture, he describes himself as 'unfortunate Patten … the sorrowing father of seven children'. All Patten's children were by his second marriage.

== See also ==
- Battle of Pinkie
