= Robert Spittell =

Scottish tailor who served Margaret Tudor

Robert Spittell or Spittall or Spittale (died 1558) was a Scottish tailor who served Margaret Tudor, queen consort of James IV of Scotland.

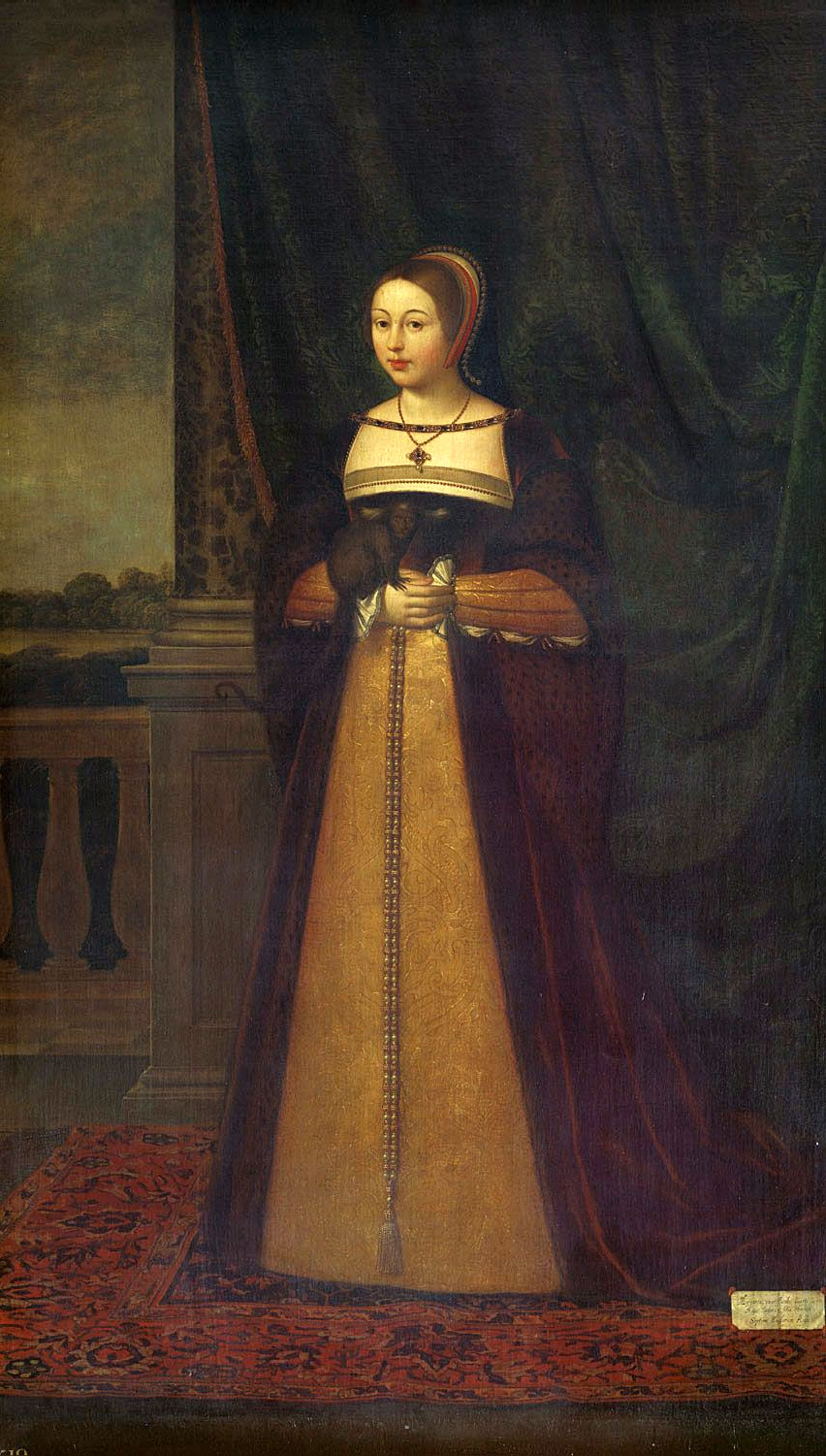
Margaret Tudor, by Daniël Mijtens

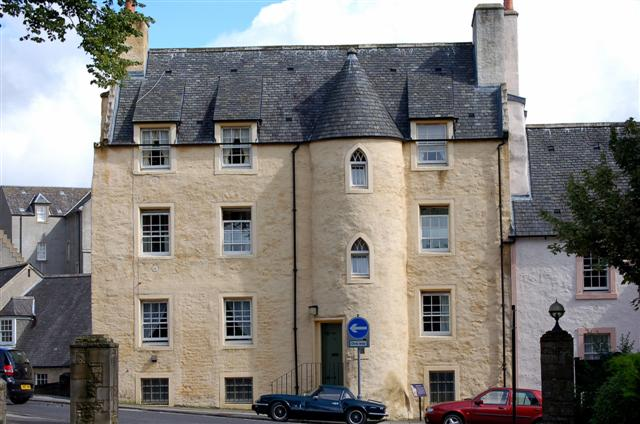
Robert Spittal's House, Stirling

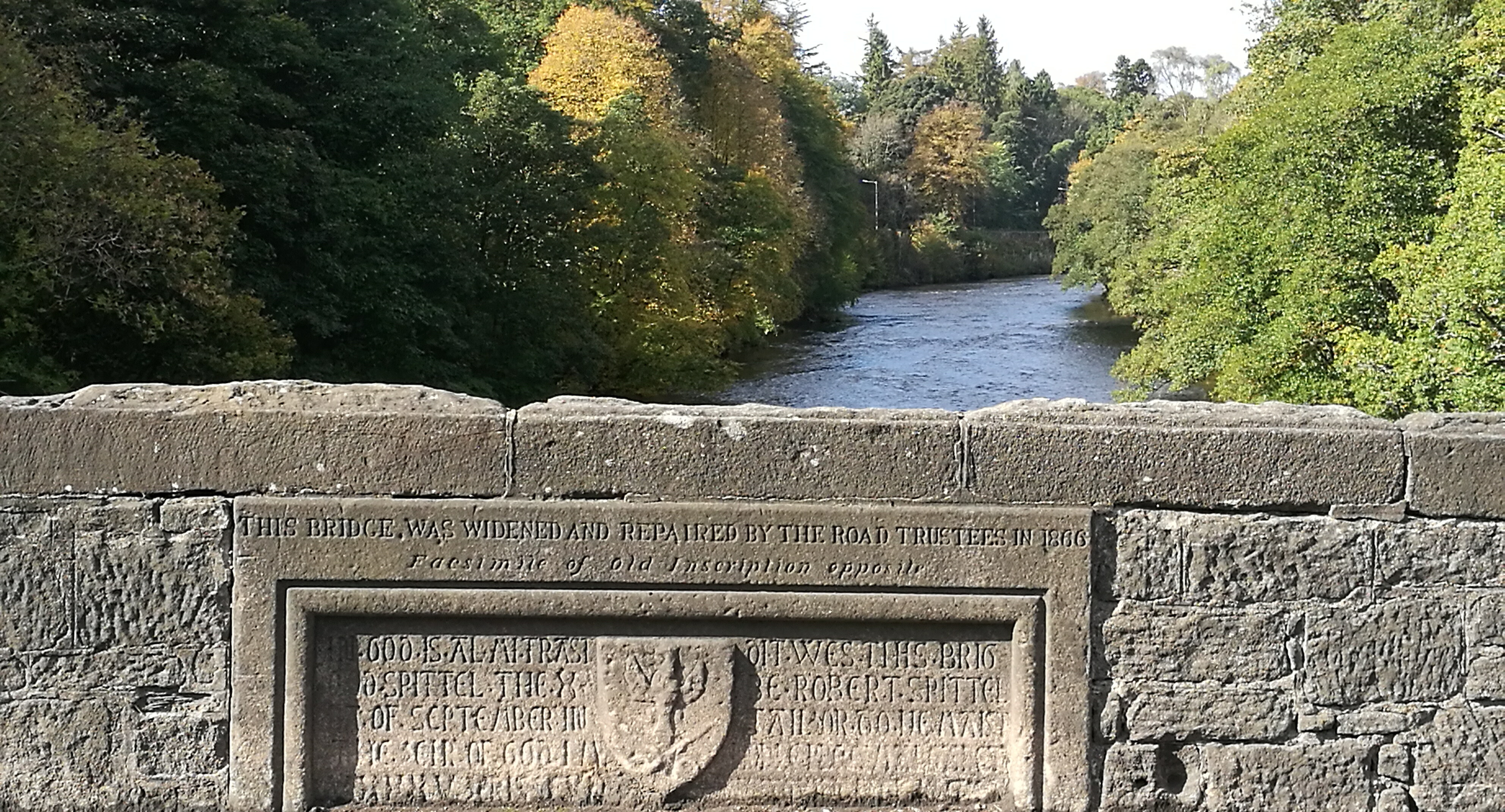
The "Brig o'Teith" with an inscription to Robert Spittell

== Clothes for a queen ==
When Margaret Tudor first arrived in Scotland, she brought an English tailor with her. In March 1504 the English tailor altered two gowns for her, and mended two kirtles.

A tailor called William Welsch seems to have been the maker of an important gown for Margaret Tudor in March 1507. The expensive fabrics included velvet and cloth of gold supplied by Jerome Frescobaldi, an Italian merchant who imported textiles from Bruges. The historian Michelle Beer argues that this gown was probably made for Margaret's "churching" after her first pregnancy, a ceremony which marked her return to full participation in court life.

== Spittell and court fashion ==
Spittell's annual salary as the queen's tailor, recorded in 1509, was £10 Scots. He was listed among the queen's male servants in December 1511 when he was given a yule-tide livery gown of brown "Rissillis", a russet cloth from Rijsel or Lille, with black velvet to edge his doublet. Male and female servants, including the African servant Ellen More were given livery clothes made from these fabrics at this time. He was given lands at Easter Coldoch near Doune in 1513.

Spittell made clothes for Eleanor Musgrave, an English courtier who features in William Dunbar's poem, Of a Dance in the Quenis Chamber. In 1511 he made her gowns, "shaffrons" or head dresses, a French hood, altered and mended her clothing, and supplied ribbons, cuffs, and collar bands.

Spittell recycled or "translated" an old white satin gown into a kirtle with a new lining of "Scottish black" for Margaret Tudor in 1511. In May 1512 he lined a pair of sleeves for the queen with velvet for one of her gowns of cloth of gold.

He made clothes in 1512 and 1513 for Prince James. After the battle of Flodden another tailor, Andrew Edgar, made clothes for the infant king.

In May 1514 Margaret Tudor was Governor or Regent of Scotland, and she granted Robert Spittell an income from the lands of Easter Leckie near Gargunnock.

After Margaret Tudor left Scotland, in 1516, Spittell delivered some of her belongings to the priest William Husband, including fur trimmings for gowns, cuffs, and sleeves. The treasurer's accounts mention that Spittell sewed fur on her stomachers.

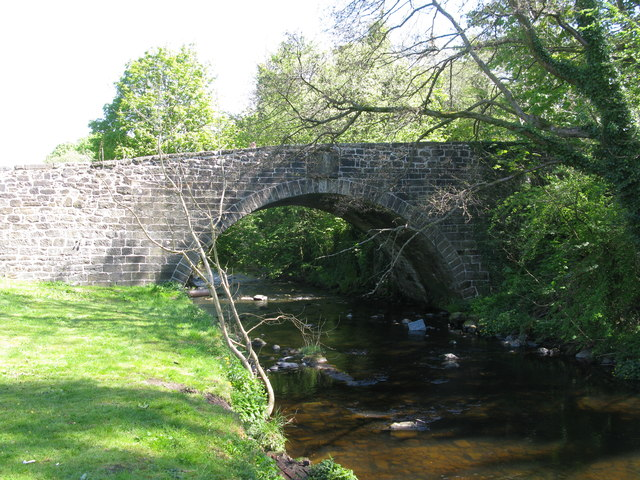
Spittal's Bridge over the Bannock Burn

Records of the burgh of Stirling call him a servant of the queen in 1521. He bought several houses in Stirling. During a property dispute in Stirling in 1527, over an encroachment on adjacent lands, he claimed that Gilbert Johnston had declared on his deathbed that Spittel was a good neighbour. Spittel paid for bridges built over the Bannockburn stream and the Teith at Doune, and founded an almshouse in Stirling in 1530, known as Spittel's Hospital.

Robert Spittell was involved in providing mourning clothes in January 1543 following the death of James V, and supplied black "dule gownis" to five gentlewomen attendants of Margaret Douglas, the wife of Regent Arran.

He died in 1558.

The inscription on his bridge over Teith was, "In God is all my trust. Quod. The X day of September in the Yeir of God MVXXXV Yeirs, Fundit wes this Brig Be Robert Spittel, Tailyer to the Maist Noble Princes Margaret, Queen of James the Feird", with a coat of arms including an eagle and tailor's scissors.

He is also said to have paid for a bridge at Tullibody over the Devon. During the Reformation Crisis, in January 1560, William Kirkcaldy of Grange demolished part of Tullibody bridge to delay French troops returning to Stirling Castle. The French commander Henri Cleutin took down the roof of the Tullibody Auld Kirk to repair the bridge.
