= Tullibody Old Bridge =

16th century bridge in Clackmannanshire, Scotland

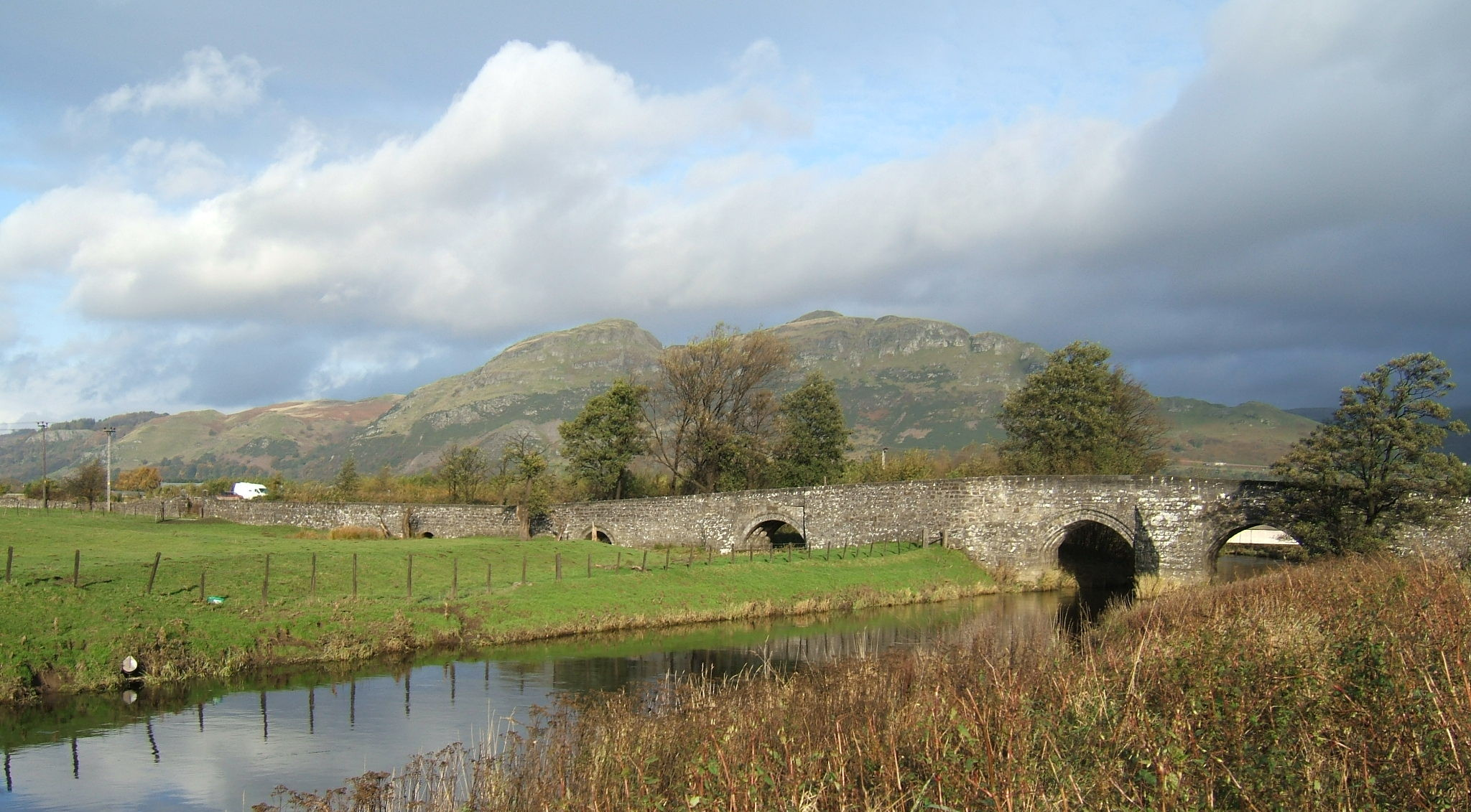
- View from SSE
- Coordinates: 56.13498°N 3.85756°W
- OS grid reference: NS 84651 95138
- Carries: 76
- Crosses: River Devon
- Locale: Clackmannanshire

Characteristics
- Design: Arch
- Material: Stone

History
- Built: Early 16th century

Listed Building – Category A
- Official name: Tullibody Old Bridge over the River Devon, Bridgend
- Designated: 9 June 1960
- Reference no.: LB1977

Location
- Interactive map of Tullibody Old Bridge

Tullibody Old Bridge, over the River Devon near Tullibody, Clackmannanshire, Scotland, dates from the early 16th century. Disused after 1915, it was restored for use by walkers and cyclists in 2003.

== Sixteenth century ==
Clackmannanshire Council's public information board names Robert Spittal, the court tailor to James IV and Margaret Tudor and a local philanthropist, as the person probably responsible for the bridge's construction. Spittal was also responsible for the Brig o'Teith over the River Teith at Doune.

Tullibody Old Bridge was built early in the 16th century, constructed of rubble with some ashlar and was designed to impede the rapid transit of horse traffic. The plan shows two opposed bends. With two main arches and three flood arches to the west, its great length (442 ft or 134.7m) probably reflects the difficulty in crossing the flood plain at this point.

The eastern arch was demolished, by William Kirkcaldy of Grange in January 1560, to hamper French troops during the regency of Mary of Guise the mother of Mary, Queen of Scots. The French commander Henri Cleutin improvised a bridge using timbers from the roof of the nearby Tullibody Old Kirk, and carried on from Fife to Stirling. A more permanent repair was made in 1560.

== Seventeenth century ==
In the 17th century the bridge was often in a ruined state but was repaired several times with funds raised by tolls levied on users. In 1697 Thomas Bauchop, a mason, received a contract for repairs from the Earl of Mar. In that year he or his son, Alloa Master Mason Tobias Bauchop, built a new eastern arch and inserted iron ties.

== Recent history ==
The Old Bridge went out of use in 1915 in favour of a lattice steel girder bridge, Downie's Bridge, built a short distance to the north to carry the A907 road. In 1999 the A907 was re-routed over the present concrete structure and the steel bridge, long neglected, was demolished in 2003.

In January 2003, Clackmannanshire Council began restoring the Old Bridge and performed vegetation clearance, resurfacing and structural repairs to the masonry in accordance with conditions laid down by Historic Scotland. The project was completed in January 2005 and Tullibody Old Bridge now forms part of the National Cycle Network in Clackmannanshire.

It is protected as a Category A listed building, and was a Scheduled Ancient Monument until 2016 when this status was removed due to dual designation.

== See also ==
- List of bridges in Scotland
