= Henri Cleutin =

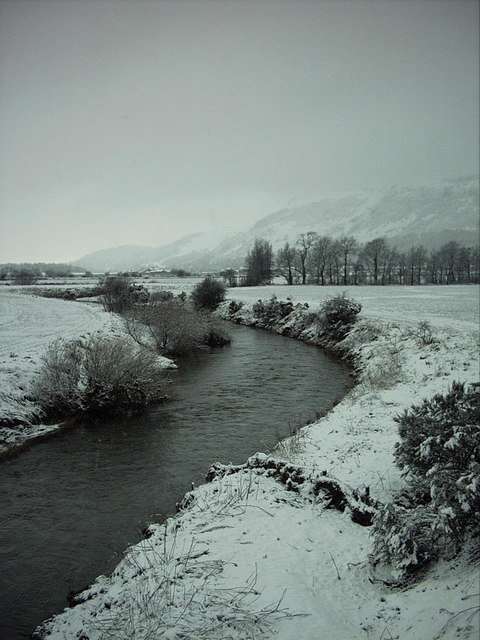
In January 1560 Henri Cleutin had to dismantle a church to cross the River Devon at Tullibody

Henri Cleutin, seigneur d'Oisel et de Villeparisis (1515 – 20 June 1566), was the representative of France in Scotland from 1546 to 1560, a Gentleman of the Chamber of the King of France, and a diplomat in Rome 1564–1566 during the French Wars of Religion.

== Early life ==
Henri was one of five children of Pierre Cleutin, or Clutin, mayor of Paris, and grandson of Henri, both were Councillors to the French Parliament. Jean Le Laboureur, the editor of Castelnau's memoirs, surmises the family had its origins in a cloth merchant who supplied Charles VI of France. Pierre Cleutin acquired the lands of Villeparisis and built a castle, and Henri Cleutin was made its lord in 1552. Henri may have been destined for the church but was involved in a murder in Paris in 1535 and fled the country. He had a pardon in 1538. On the basis of this incident the historian Marie-Noëlle Baudouin-Matuszek revised his birth date to 1515.

== Rough Wooing ==
Henri Cleutin, who was usually known as Monsieur d'Oysel, or d'Oisel, became ambassador resident in Scotland from 1546 during the war of the Rough Wooing. After Paul de Thermes left Scotland, he became Henry II of France's Lieutenant-General in Scotland. Cleutin was very much a follower of the House of Guise, who were gaining political powers in France. Scotland was ruled by Regent Arran, on behalf of Mary, Queen of Scots. He became the Duke of Châtelherault in 1548, but considerable power and a portion of the crown income was in the hands of Queen Mary of Guise, the widow of James V of Scotland.

Cleutin arrived in Scotland during an interlude of peace with England resulting from the Treaty of Ardres. However the peace treaty between Scotland and the Holy Roman Empire was not completely concluded. The Imperial ambassador in London François van der Delft became aware of Henri Cleutin, who he called "Oysif", in December 1546. The English Privy Council joked about his concerns and said that Cleutin carried letters of Bellerophon, the figure of classical myth set the impossible task of killing the chimaera after murdering his brother. It was said that during the Siege of St Andrews Castle, Cleutin counselled Regent Arran that those in the castle should be promised what they asked for, and beheaded when they came out. Arran refused such treachery, and Cleutin was said to have joked with Mary of Guise, that this was good natured of the Regent but unlike the actions of any prince he knew.

The war with England soon recommenced, and after Scotland's defeat at the Battle of Pinkie in September 1547, d'Oisel and Mary of Guise rode to Stirling Castle. According to John Knox, Cleutin was as scared as a fox being smoked in his hole. Cleutin and Walter Ogilvy took the news of the defeat to France. On 7 July 1548, when André de Montalembert Sieur d'Esse spoke at the parliament at Haddington, proposing the marriage of Mary, Queen of Scots to the Dauphin, d'Oysel as French ambassador accepted the unanimous approval. D'Oysel then went to France, returning after a long discussion with Mary of Guise's brother, Francis, Le Balafré, Duc de Aumale, on 23 January 1548 at Savigny-le-Temple.

When Ferniehirst Castle was recovered from the English in February 1549, d'Oysel was one of the first at the walls and then he settled a heated debate over the army's next step. Nicolas Durand de Villegaignon, advocated making a fortification at Roxburgh before the army moved on, and after the commanders held an inconclusive vote, d'Oysel appealed to the authority of Arran who finally agreed with Villegaignon.

== The peace ==
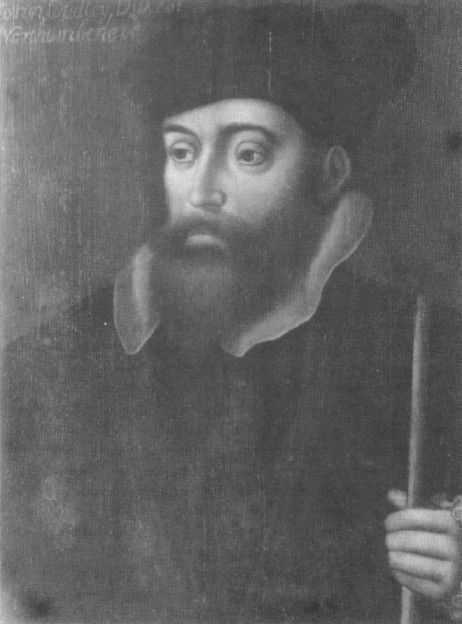
John Dudley, Duke of Northumberland criticised d'Oysel's role as ambassador for Scotland

The war with England was concluded in 1550. Cleutin was sent to England as a commissioner on border issues in April. In May, he travelled to the border to meet the brother of Mary of Guise, the Marquis de Mayenne, who had been a hostage for the peace negotiations in England. While waiting for the Marquis, he visited Dunbar Castle, Fast Castle, and Tantallon Castle. Cleutin wrote to Mary of Guise from Dunglass remarking that there was nothing there in the abandoned English fort except the things they had brought themselves. The countryside could hardly provide for their horses. Cleutin, not the Duke of Châtelherault, was left in charge of Scotland when Mary of Guise, the Queen Dowager, visited France in 1550. He visited the Duke's Craignethan Castle in November 1550. He wrote to Mary of Guise asking her to ensure that no impediment was made for food to be shipped to Scotland from France in February 1551 on account of the needs of the town of Edinburgh and the French soldiers because of the pillages and burnings during the war. Cleutin and Regent Arran travelled to Jedburgh with Camillo Marini, an Italian military engineer to plan new fortifications on the border.

At this height of the Auld Alliance between France and Scotland, the Emperor's envoy to Edinburgh, Mathieu Strick, reported that d'Oisel wielded almost sovereign authority in matters of state and justice. Unlike other French administrators employed by the Scottish court, such as Yves de Rubarye, contemporary sources point to his popularity amongst the Scottish nobility. Even an English observer, Sir Thomas Wharton observed of Guise and d'Oisel, "all in Scotland obey and lyketh them". Later Scottish Protestant chronicle writers George Buchanan and Robert Lyndsay of Pitscottie agree on his ability and singular good judgment. Buchanan describes him as, "hasty and passionate, otherwise a good man, skilled in the arts both of peace and war." James Maitland of Lauderdale, a writer of a later generation, mentions some imperfections of his nature, including his "sudden and vehement choler." Cleutin, Yves de Rubarye, and Bartholomew de Villemore, the Regent's financial controller were criticised for their lack of understanding of the Scots language, class distinctions, and regional jurisdictions.

Cleutin later wrote of his own embassy to England in peacetime, meaning perhaps February 1552 when his mission concerned the Debatable Lands, when John Dudley, Duke of Northumberland had criticised his role as ambassador of Scotland to his Scottish colleagues;

Don't you know to manage your own affairs without the help of French ambassadors? You're making a big mistake to by putting yourself under their care, and you won't be welcome with us.

Jean Scheyfve recorded Cleutin's visit to England in February 1552, writing that he had 30 or 40 captains and soldiers with him, and had heard a rumour that other French troops had passed through Ireland from the garrisons in Scotland, and that some might pass through England. After visiting France he returned to England en route to Scotland in July, but did not visit the English court.

=== Paperwork goes astray ===
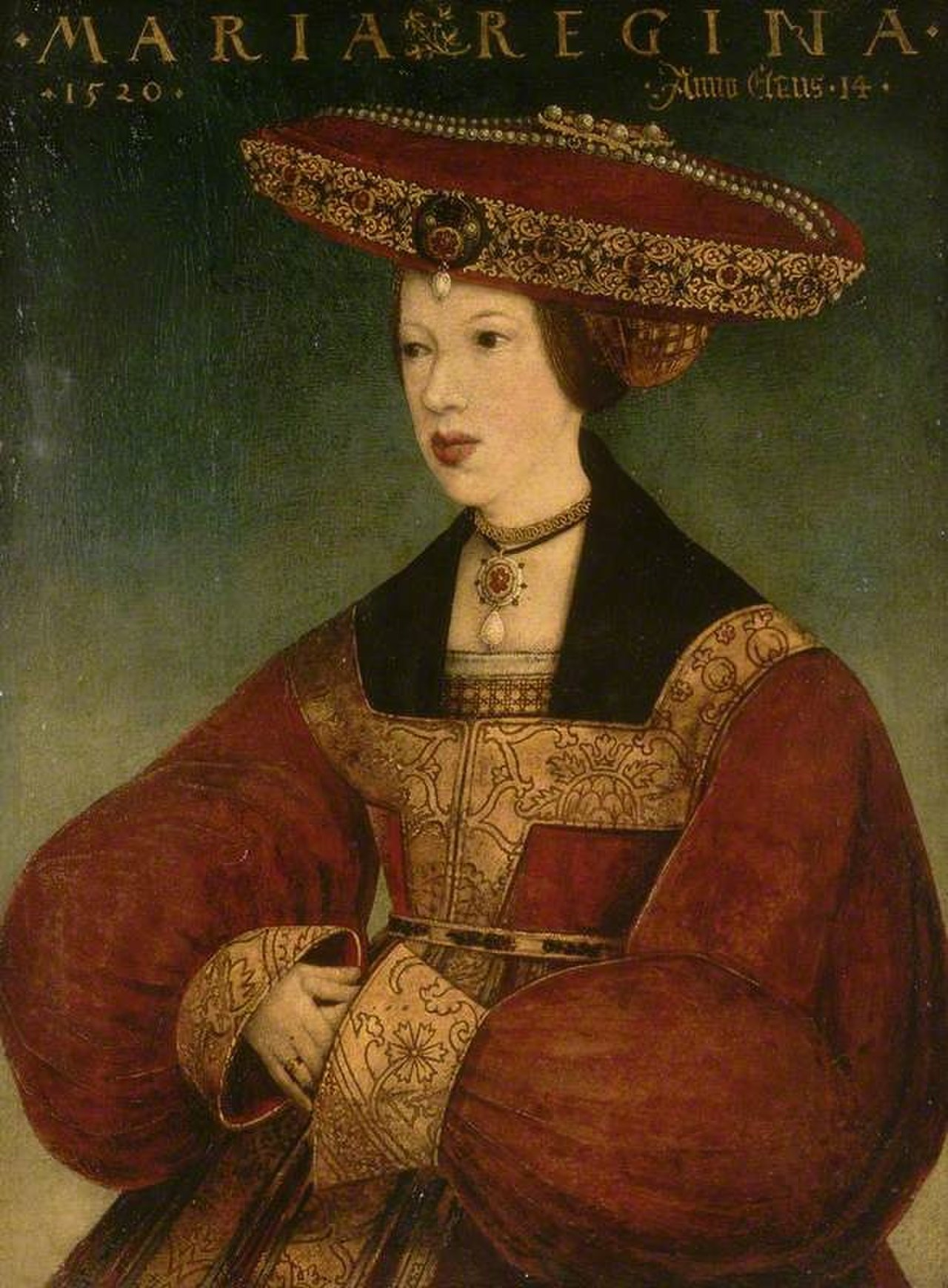
Mary of Austria, Queen of Hungary was disturbed by her discoveries in Henri Cleutin's mail

The peace concluded with England, France and Scotland after the war of the Rough Wooing (1543–1551) did not necessarily please Spain and the Empire, although a peace treaty with Charles V was concluded by Thomas, Master of Erskine in Antwerp on 1 May 1551. In October 1552, d'Oisel's papers and correspondence with Mary of Guise and Henry II of France was seized by three English agents working for Mary of Hungary, Queen Dowager Regent of the Low Countries while the packet was couriered between Calais and Boulogne. The papers included d'Oisel's accounts for the French garrisons in Scotland. Mary of Austria noted that d'Oisel used the title "Lieutenant-General of the King's Army in France and Superintendent of the King's three fortresses," which were Eyemouth, Dunbar Castle, and Inchkeith. He was paymaster of 400 Gascon, Norman, and Breton troops.

There was also a lengthy memoir to Henry II of France concerning how Scotland would be governed after Mary, Queen of Scotland, reached her majority, a subject debated by the French parliament in that year. Mary of Guise feared Châtelherault's powers might be increased. She and d'Oisel would dissemble their concerns for the time being. This memorandum continued on the subject of the arrest in Scotland of an Irishman, George Paris, who carried letters from France and England. Paris's trunk of letters had been seized by the Provost of Edinburgh and taken to Falkland Palace.

Mary of Hungary gave Thomas Gresham copies of this paper and secret instructions made for a French ambassador, Louis de Salazar, Sieur d'Asnois, in January 1549. Gresham forwarded the copies to William Cecil. Edward VI was told the news on 24 November 1552 and wrote the story in his journal. The 1549 instructions advised Salazar to foment a civil war in England during the trial of Admiral Thomas Seymour to aid France's war in Scotland.

Although there is no further record of Salazar coming to England, these instructions may have seemed genuine, as the Imperial ambassador to France in 1549, Jean de Saint Mauris, had reported that the French court were pleased to hear of Thomas Seymour's arrest, and hoped a "pernicious struggle" in England would help conclude their Scottish undertaking. Saint Mauris wrote that the House of Guise helped military preparations to this end. Protector Somerset was informed that a messenger sent to France in January 1549 by Henry Cornysshe, Captain of Jersey, saw the Duke of Guise's preparations in Brittany, which Cornysshe judged were for Scotland.

When Mary of Guise complained about the loss of these letters, sending Francisco de Busso as an envoy, the Dowager Regent replied that she found her letters to d'Oysel were inappropriate by not showing true and sincere friendship to the Emperor, and in fact expressed joy over the destruction and servitude of her own house (the House of Stewart). The English ambassador in Brussels, Thomas Chamberlayne, conveyed the Privy Council's thanks to Mary of Hungary's officers in December 1552. In May 1553, the ambassador Jean Scheyfve heard that Mary of Guise challenged Arran's regency, and hoped to replace him with James Stewart, the eldest son of James V.

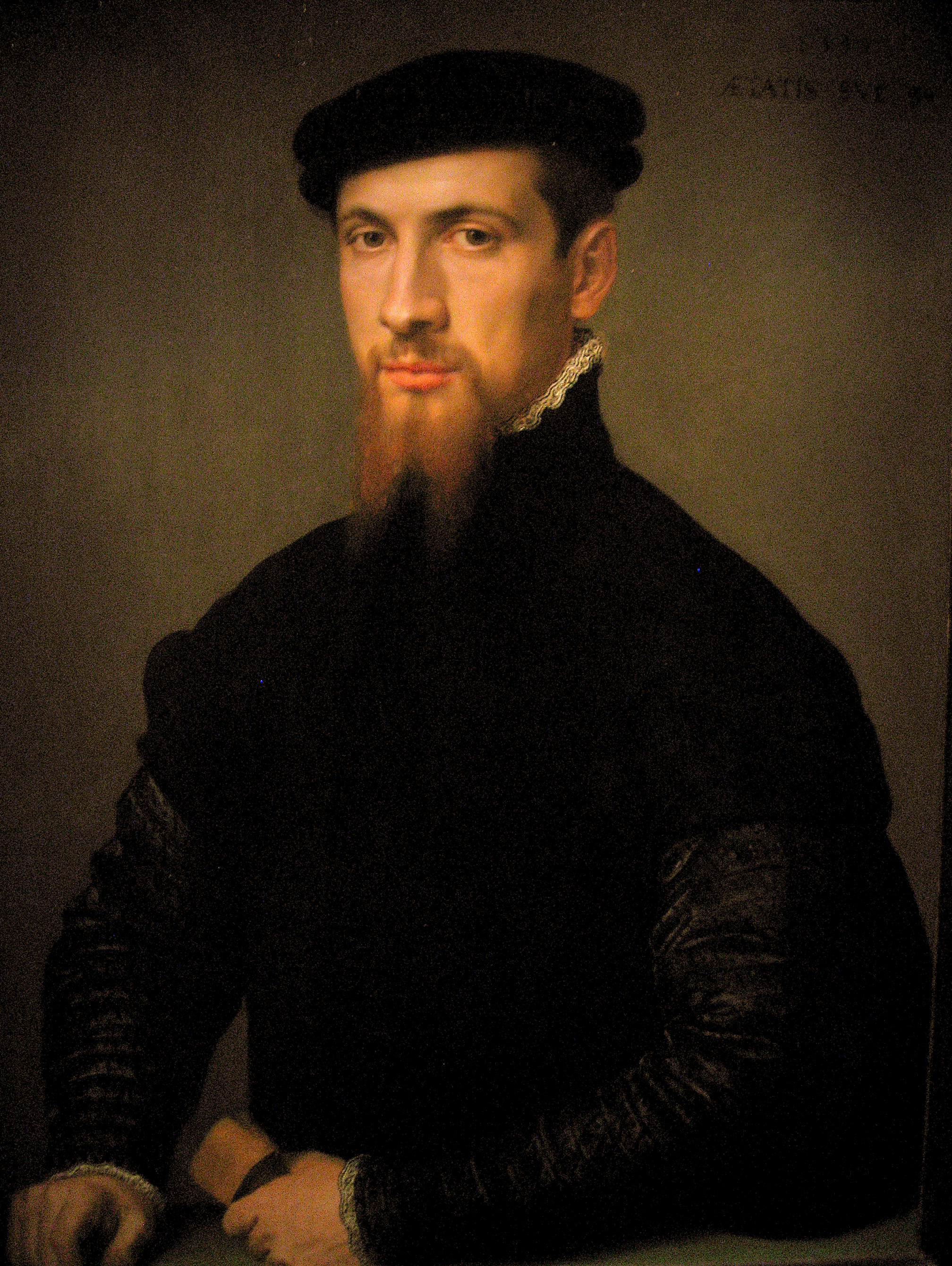
Simon Renard was told a story about d'Oisel plotting

=== Audiences with Mary I of England ===
On 29 July 1553, the French ambassador in London, Antoine de Noailles, wrote of a rumour that 6,000 French troops would have aided Lady Jane Grey, "who didn't last ten days." Henri Cleutin attended the arrival of Queen Mary I in London, they both kissed her hand at New Hall and had an audience on 3 August. Already, Noailles noted, the ladies of the court had discarded the sombre garments worn at Edward's court and were dressed in gowns of rich cloth and colour in French fashions. Cleutin was involved in the supply of luxury fabrics to the household of Mary of Guise in Scotland.

Cleutin reurned to the French court at Offemont on 7 August 1553. He spoke with the Cardinal of Lorraine, who argued that Regent Arran should be deposed and the 11 year old Mary rule in scotland instead. When Cleutin returned to Scotland from France in December, he visited Mary I of England in London, with a letter from Mary, Queen of Scots offering friendship.

=== Wyatt's confession ===
In February 1554, the Imperial ambassador in England Simon Renard heard that Thomas Wyatt, who had conspired against Mary I of England, made an allegation against Henri Cleutin. Wyatt said that d'Oisel had spoken to his associate the soldier James Croft, asking him to hinder the marriage of Philip II and Mary Tudor, help place Princess Elizabeth on the throne, and marry her to Edward Courtenay, and have Mary Tudor executed. D'Oisel, Wyatt said, had made the same offer to Mr Rogers, Peter Carew, one named South, and William Pickering, the first dapifer, with promises of money, assistance and soldiers from France. D'Oisel seems to have hinted to conspirators that such support would be forthcoming.

The French King would attack England from Scotland and mount an assault on the English strongholds at Calais and Guînes during Wyatt's enterprise. While the plot failed and the English conspirators were arrested or fled, Renard said that the Admiral, the Earl of Derby and Earl of Westmorland were on war footing to resist the potential invasion. Renard said that the Princess Elizabeth was implicated by Cleutin's letters.

At the end of March, the English ambassador in France, Nicholas Wotton, questioned the Constable of France, Anne de Montmorency about the allegations against d'Oisel. Montmorency thought the plot sounded most implausible, and the French were perfectly content with Mary's rule in England. He doubted that d'Oisel would have put himself in such danger by speaking of such a plot as he travelled through England with his wife. Wotton told the Constable he would not have opened the matter with the Constable if the Queen of England did not believe it. Montmorency said it was a case of his word against your word. On 17 April 1554, Henry II congratulated Noailles for his defence of Cleutin against these allegations. Mary remained convinced of d'Oisel's involvement in the rebellion, and a month later wrote to Wotton mentioning; "the practice attempted by D'Oysel which, however much denied, is clearly manifest."

== Regency and Reformation ==
According to some accounts, when Mary of Guise became Regent of Scotland on 12 April 1554, Cleutin rode with her from Holyroodhouse to the Tolbooth to collect the sword, scepter and crown from Arran. Cleutin is said to have placed the crown on her head and given her the sword and sceptre, in a ceremony akin to a coronation, although in his own letter describing the day to Antoine de Noailles, Cleutin merely mentions her investiture, as part of an administrative change to the "great contentment" of her supporters.

Cleutin continued as a close advisor of the Dowager Queen Regent. In August 1554, he attended a performance of David Lyndsay's A Satire of the Three Estates with Mary of Guise in Edinburgh. The master of work William MacDowall built a special seat for them at the Greenside playfield, recorded as the "Quenis grace' hous".

On 11 January 1554/5 Cleutin wrote a long letter to the Duke of Guise detailing the problems he perceived in Scotland that reduced revenue. The people needed to be ruled with a rod in the hand, desiring neither peace or justice. In frontier regions the heads of many families were no more than bandits, preying on Scots and English alike, of no value in peace or war. The many good islands were in poor estate, and French troops lightly armed in Scottish jacks would help the revenue of the Queen and Dowager. None of the Scottish fortresses would hold out for an hour against invasion, and he lacked men, a military engineer, wood, and lime for repairs. In August 1555, in a letter to Antoine de Noailles, the French ambassador in London, he described the state of the border with England on the west, and a visit by Mary of Guise to the area. The Graham Family were at the centre of troubles in the Debatable Lands. Richard Graham and his son William Graham, two English members of the family occupied lands at Canonbie, and had expelled John Graham, the Scottish owner or tenant. Cleutin commanded a unit of cavalry during the Regent's progresses.

Noailles sent Cleutin extracts from English acts of parliament relevant to border fortifications, and advocated the refortification of Dunbar Castle. Some of Noailles's letters to Cleutin were carried or forwarded by the exiled Scottish physician Michael Durham.

In May 1556, an initiative which Buchanan attributed to Cleutin and Yves de Rubay, keeper of the seals, was defeated by the Parliament of Scotland. Mary of Guise had hoped to raise new taxation for a standing army and fortifications on the border, and their proposal to compile an inventory of all property and incomes was opposed. Mary of Guise and Cleutin corresponded with French diplomats, including Noailles, using letters written in cipher code. An English diplomat, John Somers, obtained or recreated cipher keys to read intercepted letters.

=== War in 1557 ===
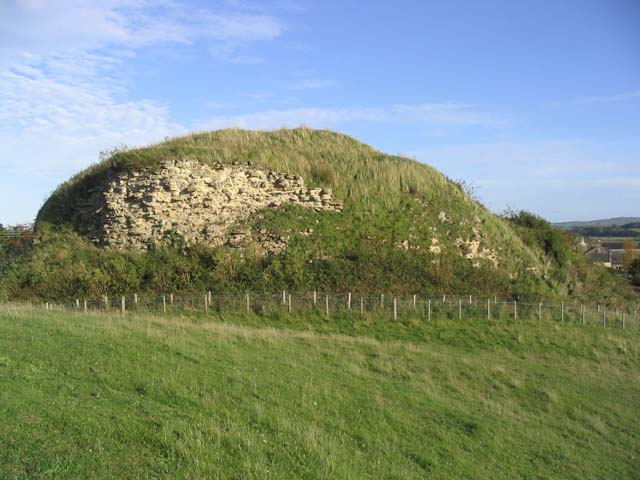
Poor weather and a reluctant Scottish army prevented d'Oysel laying siege to Wark Castle

Scotland and England were at war again in August 1557, and d'Oysel's troops re-occupied the fort at Eyemouth, and according to the Imperial ambassador in London, Simon Renard, made two successful raids on the border and burnt the hay stored at Berwick upon Tweed An English admiral, John Clere, was ordered to blockade Eyemouth to prevent guns landing there. Instead, he took his nine warships, which were notionally protecting the Iceland fishing fleet, to Kirkwall in Orkney. He landed and attacked the Bishop's Palace and Kirkwall Cathedral, but was repulsed and drowned with 97 of his men.

The English border warden heard that at least six pieces of artillery were shipped to Eyemouth to demolish Cornwall Tower, Twizell bridge and Ford bridge. The army would try to take Wark Castle at the end of August. The operation was delayed, while 12 more guns were brought overland from Edinburgh, and the French garrison at Dunbar did not release more cannon until 6 October. The Earl of Shrewsbury thought delays were caused by worsening weather, flooding, and internal dissent. On 17 October, d'Oysel gave orders for the artillery to move forward to assault Wark. Four cannon crossed the swollen Tweed and two men and eight horses drowned.

However the Scottish nobles were reluctant to go further as the weather conditions were now poor. They came to his campaign tent at Maxwellheugh, near Kelso, and, according to John Knox, told him flatly they would not invade England. The Earl of Shrewsbury wrote that d'Oysel, was "in great hevyness, and with high words ... wisshed himself in Fraunce." English spies said the nobles had to restrain the Scottish commander, the Earl of Huntly, for a day.

In this year William Kirkcaldy of Grange fought a duel with Ralph Eure, brother of the governor of Berwick, over the maltreatment of Grange's brother as a prisoner. Pitscottie wrote that Grange went to Berwick with d'Oysel and the garrison of Eyemouth, and it was agreed that none of the French or English soldiers would interfere with the combat.

=== Reformation crisis ===
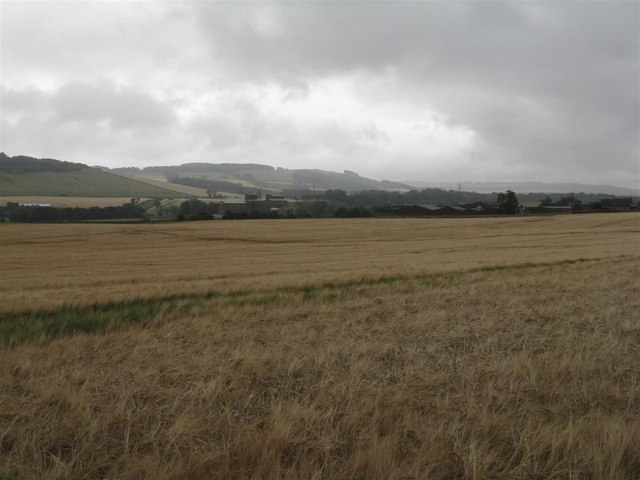
Châtelherault and d'Oysel faced the Protestant Lords of Scotland at Cupar Muir.

D'Oysel and the French interests in Scotland were now facing a greater threat from increasing support for religious reformation by the Scottish nobility. The Protestant Lords of the Congregation rose against the rule of Mary of Guise, opposed by the French troops commanded by d'Oysel alongside a Scottish army commanded by the former Regent Arran, the Duke of Châtelherault. Pitscottie gives a good account of a stand-off in 1559 across the river Eden, at Cupar Muir in Fife, between the Protestant Lords and d'Oisel and Châtelherault in command of the French and Scottish army. D'Oysel was swayed by the words of Patrick, Master of Lindsay from joining battle but first rode to the top of Tarvit Hill to spy out the strength of the opposition. Cleutin and Châtelherault then signed an eight-day truce at Owlet Hill or Garliebank on 13 June 1559.

The Congregation Lords subsequently occupied Edinburgh, and on 25 July 1559 d'Oysel signed the Articles of Leith on behalf of Mary of Guise. These were terms made for the withdrawal of the Congregation forces from Edinburgh to Stirling. In November 1559, d'Oisel worked with Jacques de la Brosse drawing up charges of treason against the Congregation Lords, Châtelherault, and his son the Earl of Arran.

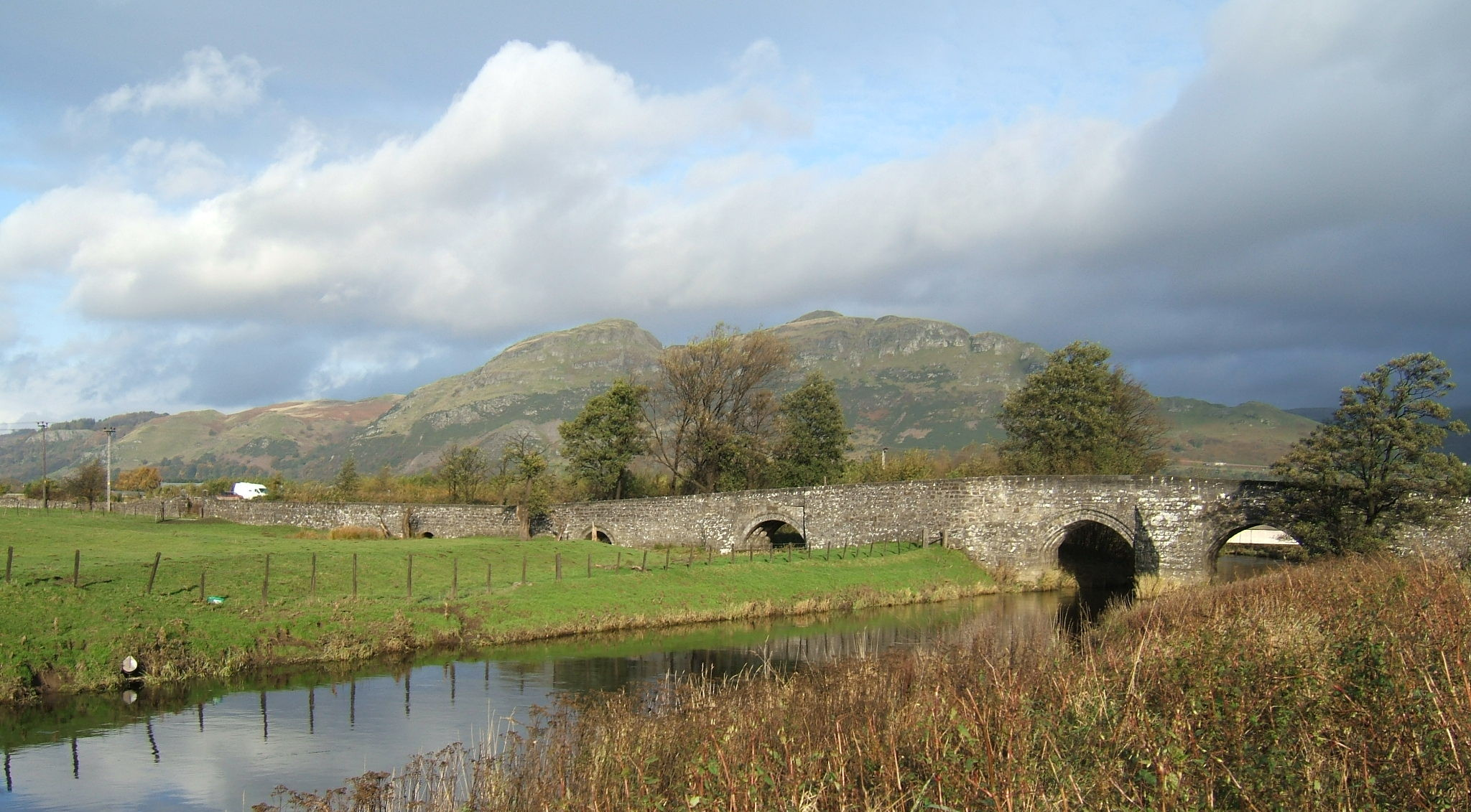
Henri Cleutin crossed the River Devon at Tullibody after an English fleet sailed into the Forth

Two years later, the English ambassador in Paris, Nicholas Throckmorton was told that d'Oysel's colleagues in Scotland, Nicolas de Pellevé, Bishop of Amiens, de la Brosse, and the newly arrived military commander Sebastien de Luxemburg, Seigneur de Martigues, came up with the idea of holding a Parliament. The dissenting lords who attended would be arrested and executed. D'Oysel and Mary of Guise were said to have disagreed and vetoed this plan.

D'Oysel and Captain Sarlabous took the town of Stirling without opposition on Christmas Day 1559. They marched into Fife and met up with reinforcements who had sailed from Leith on 7 January 1560 at Pettycur Bay near Kinghorn. An attack by the Congregation was beaten off. Later in January d'Oysel was marching troops towards the Protestant stronghold of St Andrews when the English fleet commanded by William Winter was sighted in the Firth of Forth. Winter captured two ships laden with supplies intended for his assault on St Andrews. According to John Knox, Raphael Holinshed, and Pitcottie, William Kirkcaldy of Grange destroyed the bridge at Tullibody to cut off Cleutin's retreat to Stirling. To bridge the Devon, a French engineer in his company dismantled the roof of Tullibody Kirk. The French were delayed by a day without provisions at Forth-Rig Muir or Clackmannan. In February 1560 Cleutin came from Stirling to Edinburgh and burnt Arran's Kinneil House on the way. When the Chester Herald, William Flower, delivered a message from Norfolk claiming that the English fleet had arrived in the Firth by accident, d'Oisel replied in defiance, "What got Mary Tudor by her last wars?" On 18 March 1560 he defeated a small Scots force at the battle of Glasgow bridge. On 29 March, an English army crossed the border and besieged Leith, which the French had heavily fortified. The army, commanded by Grey of Wilton, arrived at Restalrig on 6 April. Grey sent a message to Cleutin that they should parley, but with the advice of Martigues and de la Brosse he refused.

After Mary of Guise died in June 1560 the siege of Leith continued. According to Holinshed, d'Oisel vowed to defend the poor of the town who were gathering cockles on the shore from the English on 4 July, but the English attacked anyway. (A French journal of the siege places this event in May.) He was still within the town at the end of the siege. When peace was concluded, Sir Francis Leake and Sir Gervase Clifton came to his lodging for a banquet where no meat or fish was served, except one dish of horse. Cleutin left Scotland on 18 July 1560 in the English ship, the Minion with 40 companions. Early commentators lay the blame for the failure of Mary of Guise's policies on the other French advisors, de la Brosse, Martigues, and de Rubay, rather than on d'Oysel.

== Mary returns to Scotland ==
In October 1560, Nicholas Throckmorton heard Cleutin was out of favour in France due to his opposition to the plan to execute the Protestant lords, but was given leave to go home to Villeparis. In September 1561, Cleutin visited Throckmorton in Paris, saying he had been a friend to Mary, Queen of Scots and the House of Guise. Cleutin then travelled to London to obtain a passport and safe-conduct for Mary, Queen of Scots' voyage to Scotland. Cecil thought delay would serve England best. He thought uncertainty would keep her from making a marriage that would be detrimental to English policy.

Elizabeth did not oblige with permission, wishing Mary to ratify the Treaty of Edinburgh which Cleutin had helped draft, and kept him waiting. William Maitland approved of this, but learnt that Mary would sail anyway. On 6 October 1561 Throckmorton went to the Hôtel de Guise and d'Oysel brought him to speak to the Duke himself.

== Religious affairs ==
Cleutin returned to France and continued to serve Mary. He fought at the battle of Dreux in December 1562 and was knighted by Charles IX. In September 1562 he was in Heidelberg where his purpose was to declare against the opinion of François de Coligny d'Andelot that the troubles in France were not caused by religion. At the end of 1563 he was to speak to the Pope on behalf of Charles IX of France asking him not to take action against the Protestant Kingdom of Navarre. He became France's diplomat in Rome in January 1564. Brantôme gave a lengthy anecdote of his conduct there as a man of the sword rather than a man of letters, and Lebourier published two of Cleutin's letters to Bernardin Bochetel illustrating his temperament. In March 1565, Thomas Randolph heard he was in Rome trying to arrange for Mary to marry the Charles IX of France.

=== Mary and Darnley ===
Cleutin's correspondence during the discussions on a Papal dispensation for the marriage of Mary and Lord Darnley does not survive in the Vatican Archives. Cleutin wrote to Charles IX on 15 April 1566, to say that news of the murder of David Rizzio and Mary's plight had reached Rome by several letters, although he had not yet been informed himself or discussed the events with the Pope. He had heard a muddled report that Mary, who was pregnant, had fled from Edinburgh to a castle, but was brought back to Edinburgh by Darnley, and now wished to escape to France. The Bishop of Dumblane arrived with the official news on 26 April.

=== Epitaph in Rome ===
On 10 June 1566 Henri Cleutin wrote to Catherine de' Medici asking for permission to travel to Lucca to seek a remedy for his grave illness. He died in Rome later in June 1566 and was buried in the church of San Luigi dei Francesi. Captain Ninian Cockburn, a Scottish agent in Paris sent the news to Cecil. His tomb inscription was composed by Marc Anthoine Muret gives a summary of his career;

HENRICO CLEUTINO GALLO VILLAE PARISIAE D. IN SCOTIA FRANCISCI I LEGATO, ET HENRICI II GALLOS REGG. IBIDEM CVM EXERCITU PRO SCOTIAE REGINA, OB BENE MERITU, HONORARII EQUITIS MUNERE, ET IN GALLIA OB REAS IN PRAELIO AD DRUIDAS CONTRA REG. ET S. R. E. HOSTES COMMISU BENEGESTAS, A CAROLO IX TORQUATOR MILITUM ORDINE, ET CATAPHRACTOR EQUITUM ALAE PRAEFECTUS DECORATO, ROMAE AD PIUS IIII ET V PONTT. MAX. REGIS SUI NOMEN, AC DIGNITATUM ACCERIME TUTATU HONORIFICA LEGATIONE AC VITA FUNCTO.
Henry Cleutin, Sieur of Villeparisis, legate of the French Kings Francis I and Henry II in Scotland, where he served with merit with the army for the Scottish queen, was honoured with knighthood, and with fine deeds battled against the King and Pope's enemies in France, Charles IX made him a Knight of the Order of the Collar and First Master of the Great Horse, he was nominated by the King to go to Rome to Popes Pius IV and Pius V and carried out his duties with great honour.

== Family ==
Henri married Jeanne (or Marie) de Thoüars before 1546, who had been twice married; they had three children in Scotland;

- James
- Henri
- Mary Cleutin, married; (1) Claude III de l'Aubespine, Sieur de Hauterive, Baron de Chateuneuf (2) George, Sieur de Clermont, Marquis de Gallerande.

In 1552 there was some talk of Henri marrying the widowed Lady Fleming, who had been the governess of Mary, Queen of Scots in 1548, and a mistress of Henry II of France. Henri's second wife was Jeanne de Chasteigner (1543–1622), daughter of the Sieur de Rochepozay and Claude de Mauléon, Lady of Touffou and Talmont (or Albain). She had no surviving children with Henri and after his death, she married Gaspard de Schomberg, Count of Nanteuil.

== External links and sources ==
- Letter from Cleutin with news of the departure of Mary Queen of Scots and the Siege of Haddington, 17 June 1548, with other letters from the Bibliothèque Nationale de France
- Elizabeth Bonner, "The Politique of Henri II: De Facto French Rule in Scotland, 1550-1554", Journal of the Sydney Society for Scottish History, 7 (1999).
- Armel Dubois-Nayt and Valérie Nachef, 'Developing the Art of Secret Writing across Borders: The Journey of Marie de Guise’s Ciphers', Études Epistémè, 37 (2020)
- Shopping for Mary, Queen of Scots, in 1548 with Henri Cleutin
- "Plan of Ayemouth fortified by Henri Clutin 1557, British Library". Archived from the original on 20 October 2012.
- Scanned manuscript volume containing letters from Henri Clutin in Rome, 1564, from the Bibliothèque Nationale de France
- Holinshed, Raphael, Chronicles of England, Scotland, and Ireland,, vol. 4 (London, 1808)
- Laing, David, ed., The Works of John Knox, vol. 1 (Wodrow Society, 1846).
- Robert Lindsay of Pitscottie, History of Scotland: from 21 February, 1436 to March, 1565 (1728) pp. 204–7 for Coupar Muir, 1559.
