= Jeanne de Gontaut =

Jeanne de Gontaut, Countess of Noailles (c. 1520 – 26 September 1586), was a French noblewoman and the wife of Antoine de Noailles, Admiral of France and French Ambassador to England from 1553 to 1556. Following her husband's death in 1562, Jeanne became a lady-in-waiting to the queen mother of France, Catherine de Medici.

== Family and marriage ==
She was born in France, the daughter of Raymond de Gontaut, Seigneur de Cabrerès and Françoise de Bonafos, Dame de Lentour. On 31 May 1540, after four years of courtship, a contract was signed for her marriage to Antoine de Noailles, 1st Count of Noailles. Her father was against the match in the beginning, however, twelve lettres de cachet from King Francis I persuaded him to give his consent.

Her marriage produced eight children, including:

- Marie de Noailles (born 1543)
- Françoise de Noailles (born 1548)
- Marthe de Noailles (born 1552)
- Henri de Noailles, Count d'Ayen (5 July 1554 – 13 May 1623), married on 22 June 1578 Jeanne Gemaine d'Espagne, by whom he had three children, including Francois de Noailles, Count of Ayen (1584–1645).
- Françoise de Noailles (born after June 1556)

== Life ==
In 1553, Jeanne's husband was appointed French Ambassador to England. She accompanied him, but had little influence on his career. She paid visits to Queen Mary I, and wrote many letters, many of which are still extant. She was invited to visit Nonsuch Palace in February 1555 and Antoine de Noailles was permitted to hunt deer in the park with greyhounds.

Her only son, Henry, was born in London during their sojourn in England, and Queen Mary stood as the boy's godmother with the Countess of Surrey acting as her proxy.

Jeanne was pregnant with her youngest child, Françoise, when she and her husband returned to France at the end of his tenure at the English court.

Following Noailles' death in 1562, she became a lady-in-waiting to Catherine de Medici, Queen Mother of France. She herself died on 26 September 1586 at the age of about 66.
