= Andrew Edgar =

Tailor to King James V of Scotland

Andrew Edgar was a Scottish tailor who served James V of Scotland.

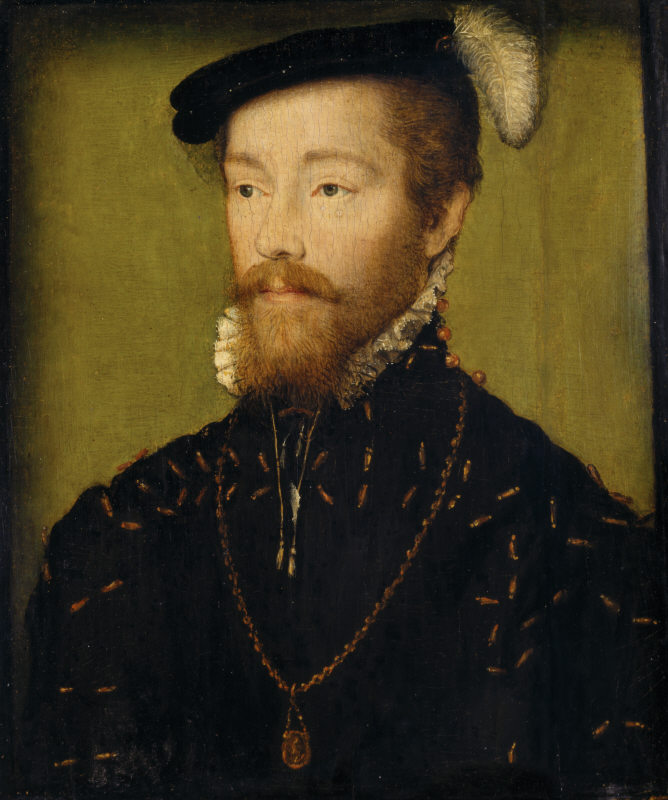
Andrew Edgar made clothes for James V of Scotland, portrait by Corneille de Lyon, Polesden Lacey

He was a son or brother of Thomas Edgar, a tailor who worked for James IV of Scotland and made items for Margaret Tudor, including a crimson satin stomacher during her pregnancy in December 1511. Andrew Edgar first appears in the records supplying cloth for the flags and standards of the king's Great Ship, the Great Michael.

Andrew or "Andro Edgair" made clothes for the infant king and his brother Alexander Stewart in the years "since the field of Flodden". Some of James' clothes in the year before Flodden had been made by the queen's tailor Robert Spittell.

Edgar had an annual fee of £20 Scots and worked with Patrick Donaldson, the yeoman of the royal wardrobe. During this time the king was growing up and learning to ride, hunt, and fight at tournaments.

In July 1522 Edgar made a velvet gown, a black velvet hugton (a short jacket), a grey velvet doublet, a pair of hose of scarlet cloth, and a chamlet winter gown bordered with black velvet. He was given silk thread to sew the clothes. The king was sent from Edinburgh to live at Stirling Castle in the keeping of Lord Erskine.

On 9 September 1523, the 10th anniversary of his succession to the throne, the 11-year old King James V was given riding clothes and armour. As part of the gift, Edgar made the king a black velvet riding coat and a jupon to wear over his jack.

Some fabrics were supplied by Michael MacQueen, a wealthy merchant who with his wife Jonet Rhynd founded the Magdalen Chapel in Edinburgh's Cowgate. The lawyer and diplomat Adam Otterburn also acquired fabrics for the king's costume. Elizabeth Crawford, wife of the treasurer of Scotland, Robert Barton, sold Edgar velvet and a fabric called Scottish black, suitable for lining the king's doublets.

Edgar made a riding coat of Paris black for James to wear at hunting in Meggetland in September 1529, and in March 1530 made a "harness doublet" of white satin, with another in May, lined with fustian. These garments were designed to be worn with armour.

1n 1529 James V appointed Thomas Arthur as his master tailor. On 20 October 1531 Edgar and Arthur and other master tailors in Edinburgh subscribed a "seal of cause" for the craft of tailoring in Edinburgh, outlining their professional values and rules for the progression of apprentices.
