= Tullibody Old Kirk =

Ruined 12th century church building in Clackmannanshire, Scotland

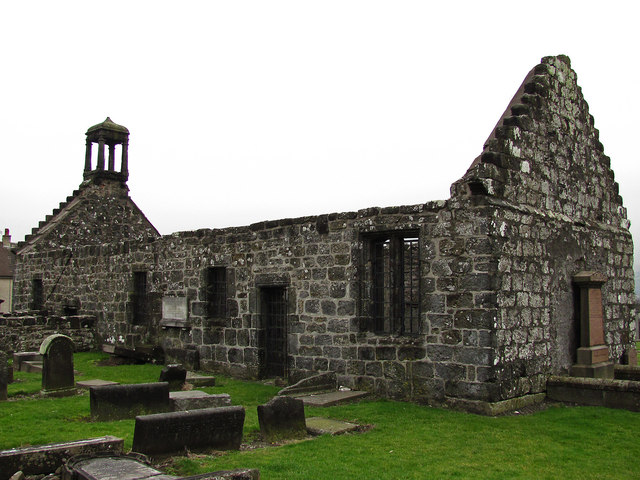
- Tullibody Old Kirk

- Tullibody shown within Clackmannanshire
- 56.136944°N 3.835556°W
- Location: Menstrie Road, Tullibody, Clackmannanshire

History
- Built: 12th century

Scheduled monument
- Official name: Tullibody, old parish church
- Designated: 18 September 1936
- Reference no.: SM626

Tullibody Old Kirk is a ruined 12th-century church in Tullibody, Clackmannanshire, Scotland. It was rebuilt in the 16th century, and restored again in 1760. The roofless building is protected as a Scheduled Ancient Monument. In 1904, St Serf's Parish Church was built to the north of the Old Kirk, which was afterwards disused.

The church measures 19 by 6.7 metres (62 by 22 ft). The bellcote on the western gable dates from 1772, while the western windows and the south porch are 19th-century additions. Two doorways survive from the 16th century, including one dated 1539.

== Monuments ==
Significant monuments include that of George Abercromby (d.1699), and the Haig memorial on the north wall. The surrounding burial ground is a Category B listed building.

During the Scottish Reformation, William Kirkcaldy destroyed the bridge at Tullibody in an attempt to prevent French troops from retreating to the Siege of Leith at the end of January 1560. However, the French removed the roof of Tullibody Kirk and used it to bridge the Devon.
