= Tullibody =

Village in Clackmannanshire, Central Lowlands, Scotland

Coordinates: 56.135400°N 3.836405°W

Tullibody: Scottish Gaelic: Tulach Bòide
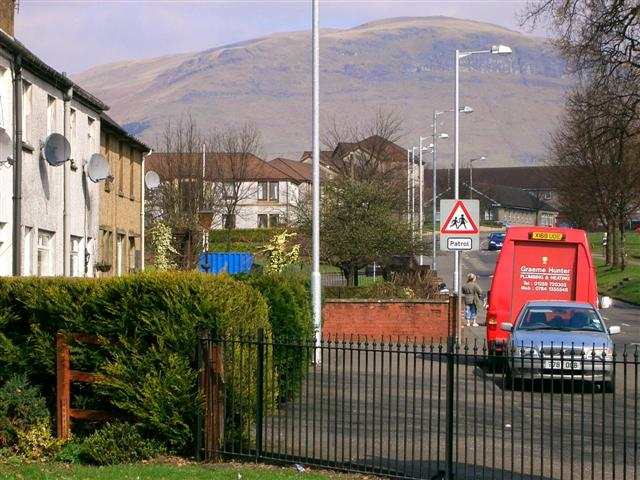
- Residential area of Tullibody with the Ochils in the background

- Location within Clackmannanshire
- Area: 3.03 sq mi (7.8 km^{2})
- Population: 8,490 (2020)
  - Density: 2,802/sq mi (1,082/km^{2})
- OS grid reference: NS859951
- Council area: Clackmannanshire
- Lieutenancy area: Clackmannanshire
- Country: Scotland
- Sovereign state: United Kingdom
- Post town: ALLOA
- Postcode district: FK10
- Dialling code: 01259
- Police: Scotland
- Fire: Scottish
- Ambulance: Scottish
- UK Parliament: Alloa and Grangemouth
- Scottish Parliament: Clackmannanshire and Dunblane

Tullibody (Scottish Gaelic: Tulach Bòide) is a village set in the Central Lowlands of Scotland. It lies north of the River Forth near to the foot of the Ochil Hills within the Forth Valley. The village is 1 3/4 miles (3 kilometres) southwest of Alva, 1 3/4 miles (3 kilometres) northwest of Alloa and four miles (six kilometres) east-northeast of Stirling. The village is part of the Clackmannanshire council area.

According to a 2012 estimate the population of Tullibody is approximately 8,710 or 9,530 residents including the area of Cambus.

== History ==
There are remains of human activity in the Tullibody area from Mesolithic times. On Braehead Golf Course, the green-keepers found a midden containing shell remains of mussels, scallops and cockles dating back to 4000 BC. Known as The Braehead Shell Midden it is one of the few found on the north side of the Forth. The Haer Stane, now part of Tullibody War Memorial, is said to have formed part of a circle of standing stones.

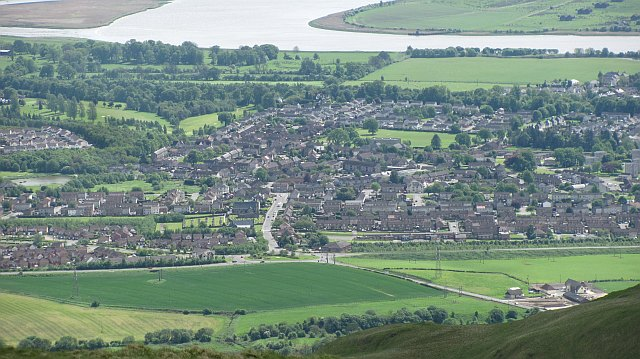
Tullibody including Menstrie Road and views towards the Forth from Colsnaur Hill

It is thought that the church in Tullibody dates from the end of the fourth century and St. Serf ministered to the church in the 5th century on his journeys to Alva. Folklore states that Kenneth MacAlpin, King of Scots, amassed his army on Baingle Brae before he fought and subdued the Picts. He is reported to have given Tullibody its name, calling it "Tirly-bothy" meaning oath of the croft. Certainly there was a standing stone on the main road to Stirling (near the Catholic Church) until the early 1900s when it is then reported to have been demolished to make ready for the road upgrading. An alternative toponymy has been suggested.

David I of Scotland was responsible for Tullibody's claim to fame when in 1149 he granted the lands and fishing rights to Cambuskenneth Abbey and it was then that the Auld Kirk was erected, where it still stands today. Hugh de Roxburgh was the rector of Tullibody, Chancellor of Scotland and bishop of Glasgow in the late 12th century. A 19th century map shows the church with the Priest's Well and the Maiden Stone at the graveyard.

Edward I of England, in his attempt to subdue the Scots in 1306 reportedly tried to build a castle in Tullibody, on the hill behind the Delph Pond. As it would have been of wooden construction, no one has ever found any proof.

In January 1560, William Kirkcaldy of Grange demolished part of Tullibody bridge to delay French troops returning to Stirling Castle. The French commander Henri Cleutin, known as General D'Oysel, took down the roof of the Auld Kirk to repair the bridge. Tullibody, unlike Alloa, had its own Parish Church until the start of the 17th century when it lost its superior status and Alloa became a parish in its own right. Bishop Keith said of Alloa Parish that it "swallowed up the mother church" at Tullibody. The Abercrombys made The Auld Kirk their family cemetery. In 1600 there were between four and five hundred communicant members, above the age of 16, at the church in Tullibody.

In 1645, the Earl of Montrose, on the night before the Battle of Kilsyth, encamped his forces in the woods of Tullibody. A daggered footnote in the Old Statistical Accounts suggests that Montrose was pursued by the Marquis of Lorn who probably camped at the spot now known as Lorn's Hill.

One of the earliest maps of the area was made by surveyor and cartographer John Adair in 1681.

In 1745 Stirling's Secession preacher Ebenezer Erskine left Stirling which was under the control of the Jacobite army and preached to his people in the wood at Tullibody.

The church was rebuilt in 1760 at the cost of George Abercromby, first laird of Tullibody. A fine memorial to his father and grandfather dating from 1700 (and similar to the huge graves in Greyfriars Kirkyard lies against the wall of the church.

== Tullibody House ==
An earlier house on the site was built around 1680 by a Robert Meldrum. It was purchased by the Abercrombie/Abercromby family around 1705. The fine replacement mansion house was built around 1710 by the Abercrombie family. Its second laird, George Abercrombie (1705-1800) was a major agricultural improver who co-founded the Highland Society in 1784 and applied many of his principles to his own estate. His main position was as Professor of Law at Edinburgh University. In the 19th century the ground was turned to industry. The house was demolished around 1960.

George's sons were raised in the house and each rose to fame: Sir Ralph Abercromby, Robert Abercromby of Airthrey and Alexander Abercromby, Lord Abercromby.

== Economy ==
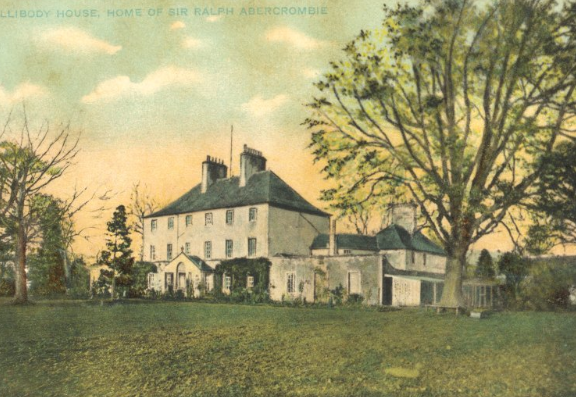
Tullibody House

Tullibody is a former mining town, although neither that industry nor any other major employers have a presence in the town, with many of the residents now commuting to Stirling and Alloa to work. Historically, there was work with wool employing 30–40 people and a tannery on Alloa Road, which employed 30 to 40 men processing leather and making glue. The site near the Delph Pond, a former curling pond, was demolished, being replaced with new housing in 2017. Since the late 1990s and early 2000s, there has been a rapid expansion in housebuilding in the town, with 400 new houses built on the north side of the village in the last 5 years.

== Education ==
The town has four primary schools – St. Bernadette's, Abercromby, Banchory and St. Serf's – with young people also attending the local high schools including Lornshill Academy, St Modan's High School, Alloa Academy and Alva Academy. Tullibody has seen a massive leap in education when Clackmannanshire Council in 2017-2019 spent £15 million making the new Tullibody South Campus building featuring the Tullibody library, Abercromby Primary and St. Bernadette's RC School.

== Famous people ==
- Jonathan Gavin (1966 – 2013) Judo World Masters.
- Anne Gavin (born 1967), Judoka.

== In the arts ==
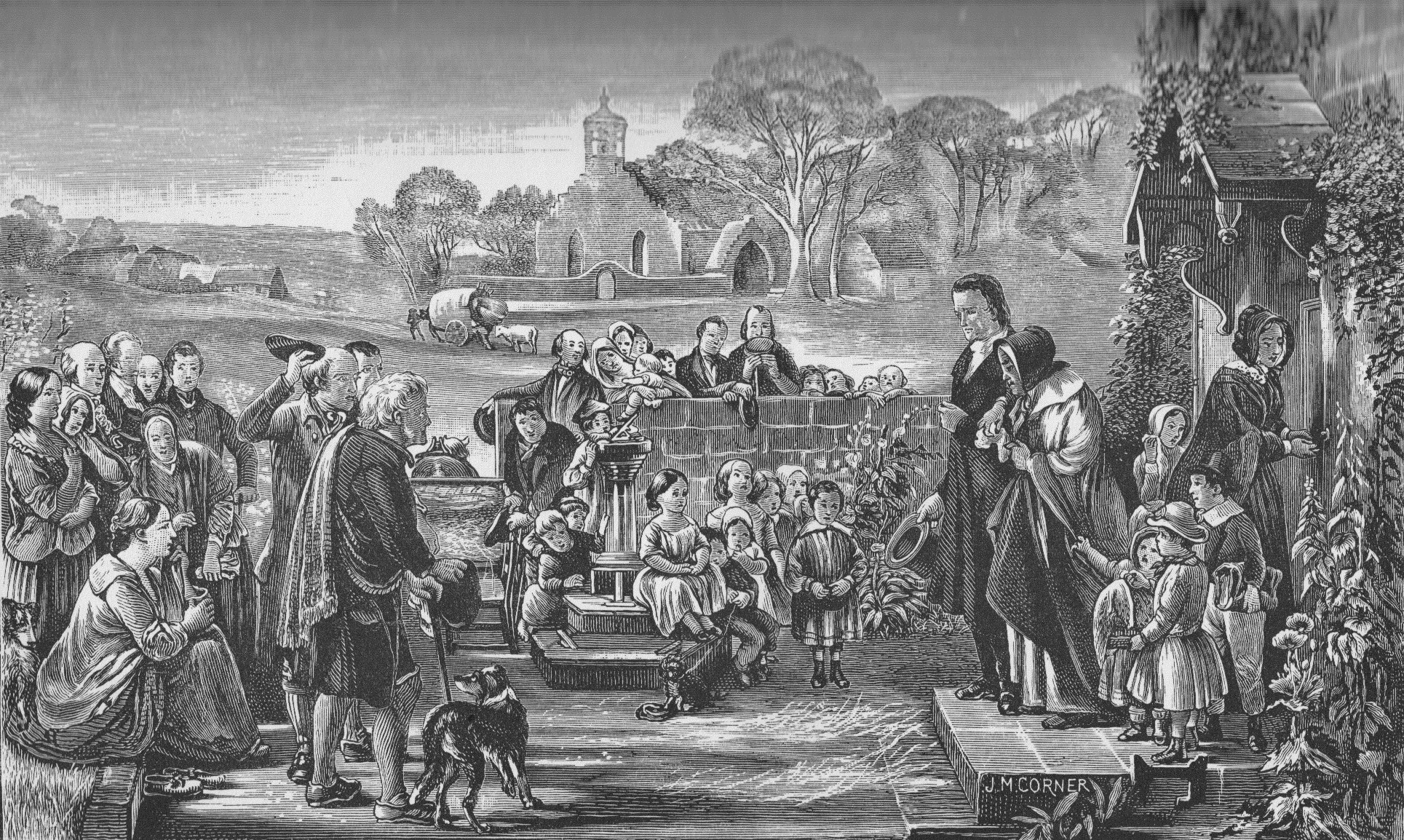
Leaving the Manse (engraving J. M. Corner) based on Quitting The Manse (oil painting G. Harvey) – featuring Tullibody Old Kirk

Tullibody Old Kirk is depicted in George Harvey's famous work of 1848 Quitting the Manse. The work is rarely on display due to bad bitumen damage caused by Harvey's experiments with varnish. The subject of the painting is a minister and his wife leaving their home in a national event known as The Disruption where around a third of the ministers quit the Church of Scotland protesting that congregations must be able to choose their own minister. This was often done at considerable personal sacrifice as they left their salaries, their homes and sometimes their congregations to set up the Free Church in May 1843. There was a Free Church in Tullibody in the 19th century. Harvey is known to have done many studies for his paintings and Tullibody Church is owned by the Stirling Smith Art Gallery and Museum.

There are at least three poems relating to The Maiden's Stone. One is a three-part poem called "The Maid of Myreton; A Tale of Tullibody". The subject of the poem is a parish priest Peter Beaton who fell in love with Martha, the only child of Wishart, the laird of Myreton. The affair did not end well with her dying of a broken heart but leaving a letter for her father:

The letter opened, and thereon was wrote
What sort of tomb she wished, the place and spot.
"Place me," it ran, "in coffin made of stone.
Nor tree plant near, nor earth be laid thereon,

And let the distance be about a perch
Before the middle entrance of the church,
So that false Beaton, passing out and in.
May see the relic of his pride and sin."

He saw it not, already he had fled;
Another priest read service o'er the dead;
And those who sought him, sought him all in vain.
He ne'er was seen by living man again.

Long, long the church was wrapt in silent gloom,
The door built up that faced the Maiden's Tomb;
The tomb lies open, empty, broken, marred,
In ancient Tullibody's quiet graveyard.

There is also a longer poem about the same subject called "The Maiden's Stone of Tullibody". A third, much shorter, poem called Martha of Myreton comes sandwiched between a poem about the same graveyard and another entitled Tullibody which repeatedly describes Tullibody as sweet.

Tullibody, as well as having a famous stone coffin, is also recorded to have had an iron coffin case as an attempt to thwart local body-snatchers. These deterrents were known as mortsafes.

Punch magazine ran a poem about an eagle, which threatened a baby in its pram, which could not be diverted even when offered three different kinds of biscuit.

A song is recorded in the same volume, called "Gently rising Tullibody" which praises the town and Abercromby's military victory in Egypt over the French. Yet another poem which mentions Tullibody is from the same book and involves a dialogue between a Besom Cadger and a Fisherwoman. The title is Causey Courtship.

== See also ==
- List of places in Clackmannanshire

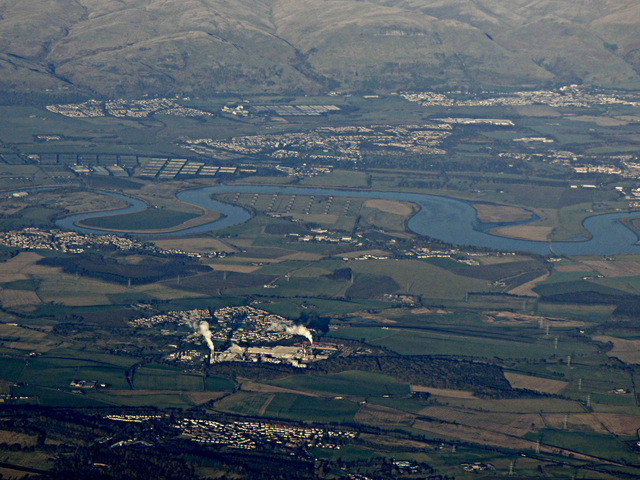
Tullibody with Menstrie and Alva at the foot of the Ochils beyond it. The bonded warehouses at Cambus, and Tullibody Inch are nearer the photographic position in the air above Cowie. Meanders on the Forth and the remains of Alloa Swing Bridge from Throsk are also visible.
