= Thomas Arthur (tailor) =

Scottish tailor who worked for James V of Scotland

Thomas Arthur was a Scottish tailor who worked for James V of Scotland. He used a fabric described as "Highland tartan".

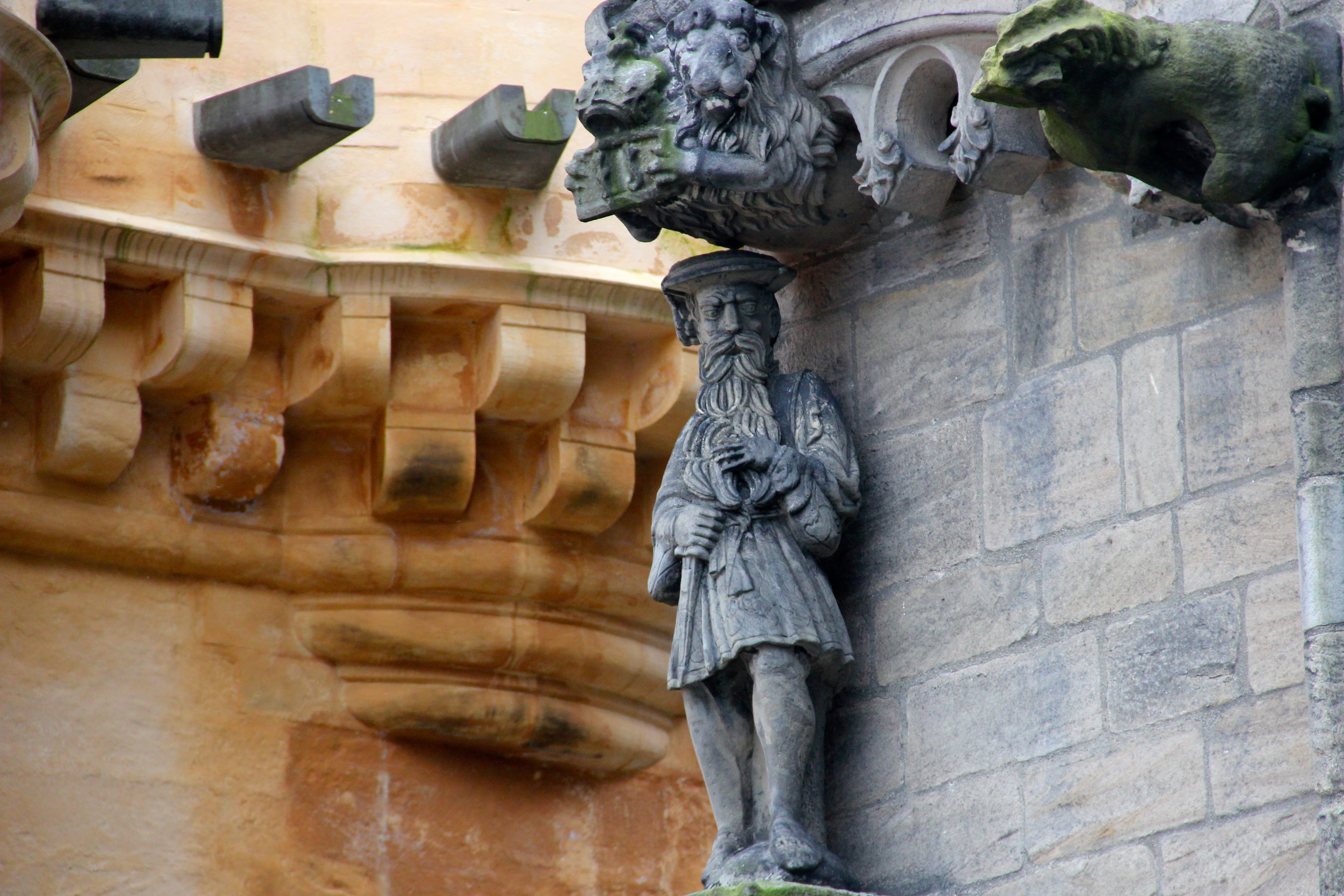
Statue of James V at Stirling Castle, 1540

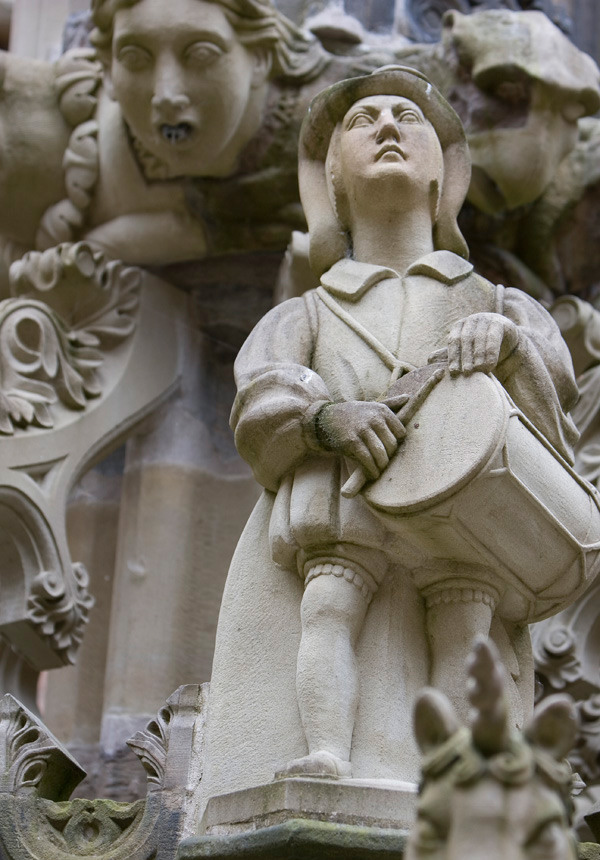
Thomas Arthur made costumes for court entertainments held at Linlithgow Palace

== Career ==
Arthur was made master tailor to the king in 1529. During the previous years of the king's minority, his clothes had been made by Andrew Edgar.

Arthur's work is known through the accounts of the treasurer of Scotland, and inventories of the king's clothes. The published editions of the accounts by James Balfour Paul do not include the detail of the lining and secondary fabrics of costume, described in the original manuscripts in the National Archives of Scotland. Another tailor, Richard Hills, made some of the King's clothes when he was in France.

In August 1538, Thomas Arthur made clothes for James V using Highland tartan. The "Heland tertane" was used to make hose for a Highland outfit sent to James V at Stirling Castle. Arthur had previously made a tartan "galcoit", which was a gift for the Master of Forbes in February 1533. More tartan for another "galcoit" was bought in Dundee in December 1533. The "galcoit" was worn while riding.

Thomas Arthur made gowns and shirts for Senat or Serat, a French entertainer who was Mary of Guise's fool. Arthur made clothes for Lady Jean Stewart, Lord James of Kelso, and Lord James of Saint Andrews, the children of James V who resided in the household of Mary of Guise or at St Andrews.

Some clothes for the women of the royal household were made by the "French tailor", and they collaborated in providing a marriage gown for Jeanne de la Rainville alias Gresmore when she married Robert Beaton of Creich in May 1539. Arthur's servant carried fabric to the French tailor at St Andrews. Walter Quhyte, from February 1539, and then a French tailor, probably Jacques de la Grange, made clothes for Lady Jean Stewart, one of the king's daughters, and for Helen and Elizabeth Stewart, sisters of the Earl of Lennox, who were members the household of Mary of Guise at Linlithgow Palace in March 1539 and with her at Pitlethlie in May 1539. He made gowns and kirtles for them of black and red velvet, satin, and taffeta, with French hats, hoods with velvet "saferis" (French hoods), and riding hoods called "barbutes".

In January 1540, Arthur made "play coats" of red and yellow taffeta, and a side cape for one of the players. These costumes were for an early performance of David Lindsay's "A Satire of the Three Estates" in the Great Hall of Linlithgow Palace.

In February 1540 he made a bonnet to line the crown of Scotland which the goldsmith John Mosman had recently refurbished. The bonnet was made of purple velvet and lined with purple satin. Thomas Arthur worked in Edinburgh and would bring the clothes to the king at his palaces. His servants brought clothes to Stirling Castle in March 1540 and were given a reward or tip recorded as "drinksilver". At Easter 1541 he brought a coffer of clothes to Stirling Castle, including a black Venice satin doublet with gold buttons, and black hose. He also delivered new clothes to the King's servants, including the pursemaster John Tennent who would "deliver them where the king commanded".

He made clothes for the king's two sons, and mourning cloaks for ladies in waiting to wear at the funeral of Margaret Tudor in Perth in November 1541. In March 1542 he made a nightgown for Mistress Margaret, sister of the Earl of Lennox.

A lady-in-waiting Katherine Bellenden worked in the royal wardrobe. She sold cloth to Thomas Arthur. Her niece, also called Katherine Bellenden, married Robert Craig, one of Thomas Arthur's servant-tailors.

Arthur was not employed by Regent Arran. After the death of Thomas Arthur, in 1551 any money he had owed to James V was granted by Regent Arran to the soldier Robert Hamilton of Briggis and William Hamilton of Humbie.

A tailor called Thomas Arthur worked in England at this time, and in 1527 joined a company of actors. He entered into a legal dispute with George Maller, who was a glazier by trade, who had undertaken to train Arthur to be a player or "interluder" in the court revels of Henry VIII. It is not clear if this was the same man.
