= Henri de Noailles =

Henri de Noailles, comte d'Ayen (1554–1623), son of Antoine, was a commander in the religious wars, and was made comte d'Ayen by Henry IV in 1593.

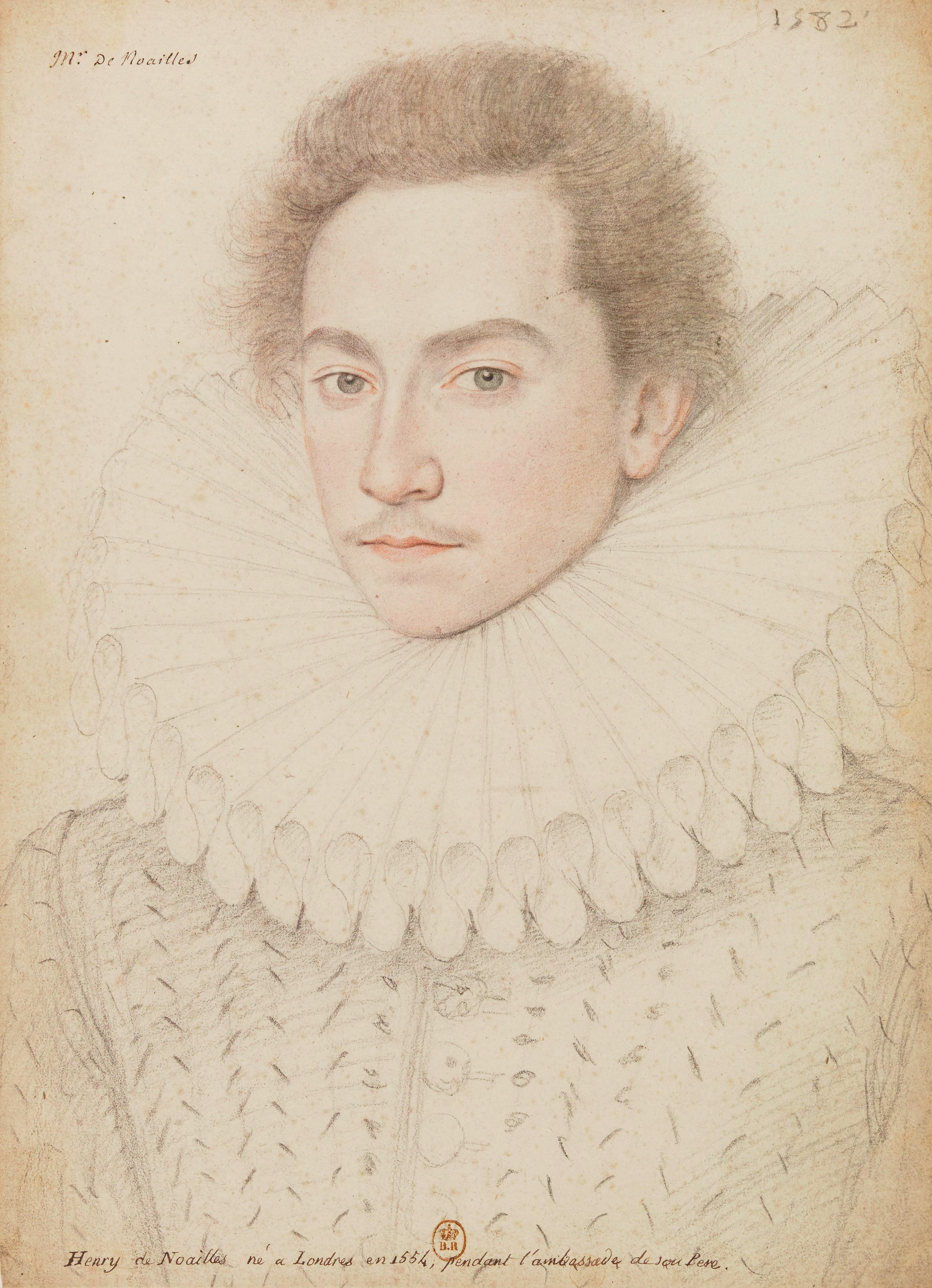
Henri de Noailles.
