= Antoine de Noailles =

French admiral and ambassador

Coat of arms of the counts and dukes of Noailles (gules, a bend or).

Antoine, 1st count of Noailles (4 September 1504 – 11 March 1563) was ambassador in England for three years, 1553–1556, maintaining a gallant but unsuccessful rivalry with the Spanish ambassador, Simon Renard.

Antoine was the eldest of three brothers who served as French diplomats, three of the 19 children of Louis de Noailles and Catherine de Pierre-Buffière. His brothers Gilles and François were clergymen and diplomats.

== Diplomatic career ==
His career started at the age of 25 with a trip with Francis de la Tour, Viscount of Turenne, to Spain to arrange the marriage of Francis I of France with Eleanor of Austria, and he signed the final marriage contract. He then helped in the Italian wars and two missions to Scotland in 1548. Noailles helped to equip the ships at Brest and Le Havre which sailed to Scotland to carry Mary, Queen of Scots from Dumbarton.

Antoine de Noailles came to London on 30 April 1553 and served as ambassador, as a replacement for his cousin, René de Laval de Boisdauphin, until 4 June 1556. After the death of Edward VI, he found himself to be a rival of the Imperial ambassador Simon Renard, who was more in the favour of Mary I and her government, while Noailles and French policy had supported the accession of Lady Jane Grey. Noailles became an ally of the Venetian ambassador Giacomo Soranzo.

=== Noailles and Scotland ===
France was an ally of Scotland by the long celebrated Auld Alliance, and Noailles was a friend of the diplomat and soldier Henri Cleutin, sieur d'Oysel, who served Mary of Guise, who would become the Regent of Scotland in 1554. Noailles and Cleutin travelled to New Hall to meet Mary I on 29 July 1553. Cleutin returned to Edinburgh, and Noailles assured the Constable of France, Anne de Montmorency, that he would keep Cleutin informed of developments in London. In August 1553, Mary of Guise began to write to Noailles in code.

Noailles discovered that the Earl of Lennox and his wife Margaret Douglas had plans to obtain the Regency of Scotland, but Mary would not let her favourites return to Scotland to canvas support from Archibald Douglas, 6th Earl of Angus. He sent news to Guise and Cleutin in Scotland including the fall of Vercelli in Piedmont and the death of Şehzade Mustafa, a son of Suleiman the Magnificent. In December 1553, Noailles discussed the issues of the Scottish border with William Kirkcaldy of Grange, and understood that the financing of some French troops in Scotland was partly the responsibility of an Italian banker Timothy Cagnioli who kept an account of the expenses of the soldiers. In January 1554, Noailles sent news of the negotiations for the marriage of Mary I to Philip of Spain to Mary of Guise in Scotland.

=== Noailles on fashion and the coronation of Mary I ===
Noailles described the costume worn at Mary's court, in French style with wide sleeves and rich fabrics, which he claimed was in contrast to the fashion in the time of Edward VI, which had been influenced by religious considerations which he called "superstitions". He did not participate in her Royal Entry to London on 3 August and remained (with Henri Cleutin) in his lodging at the Charterhouse. According to Renard, Noailles observed some of the proceedings from his window, and was able to provide a description of the procession. Renard noted that Mary wore violet velvet, with skirts and sleeves embroidered with gold.

Noailes provided a "relation" of the coronation entry on 30 September, which included two men dressed to represent to Duchies of Gascon and Normandy. Noailles wrote that Mary wore silver and her litter and horses were draped with cloth of gold. Elizabeth and Anne of Cleves also wore silver. Women of court dressed in French style in silver and gold rode with horses covered with crimson "cramoisy" velvet (this detail appears to differ in other accounts). He also provided a description of the coronation itself and the banquet in Westminster Hall.

According to Noailles, the Lady Elizabeth refused or avoided wear jewels which her sister gave her at the time of her coronation. In September 1553, Noailles wrote to Henry II of France and Catherine de' Medici that Mary delighted in clothes and would appreciate gifts of costume including "crespes, collets, manches et sembables petites choses", head dresses, collars, sleeves and other suchlike small things. He also suggested an exchange of portraits. He also wrote to Mary of Guise about the new fashions and excess in dress at the English court, particularly the brightly coloured costumes and rich fabrics now worn by older women and the embroidered hose worn by male courtiers.

=== Intelligence gathering ===
Noailles came to depend on informers and spies. These included; a French painter at court known as "Nicholas"; one of Mary's chamberers; and an exiled Scottish physician, Michael Durham, who had attended James V of Scotland in 1542 and came to be suspected of poisoning him, and had been imprisoned in Edinburgh Castle. Durham received a pension from the English exchequer.

Noailles received information from Mary's court from "Jehan Aly", who was possibly John Leigh, a son of Lord Edmund Howard. An exiled French soldier, Jean de Fontenay, sieur de Berteville, who had fought against the Scots at the battle of Pinkie, introduced Antoine de Noailles to Sir Henry Dudley, a conspirator against Mary I. Susan Clarencieux, one of Mary's servants, told Noailles of doubts that Queen Mary was pregnant in 1555. Noailles came to believe that Mary's phantom pregnancy in 1555 was caused by a cyst or tumour.

=== Wyatt's rebellion ===
In January 1554, Mary I assured Noailles that her marriage would not change her commitment to existing peace treaties with France, and he passed this assurance to France's allies in Scotland. According to Hugues Cousin le Vieux, a courtier and quartermaster at the Imperial court, Noailles was prominent in orchestrating opposition to the marriage and fomenting rebellion.

Noailles and Henri Cleutin had some contact with opponents to the marriage at Mary's court, and the supporters of an alternative potential husband Edward Courtenay, 1st Earl of Devon, and they made offers of support to conspirators involved in Wyatt's rebellion including James Croft. Henry II of France sent a special envoy, La Marque, offering a fleet of ships commanded by Nicolas Durand de Villegaignon to be a presence off the coast of Devon and Cornwall.

Sir John Leigh (1502–1566) was a useful contact, with court connections amongst those unhappy at the prospect of Mary's marriage to Philip of Spain. A Scottish agent employed by Noailles called Broughton was said to have induced and suborned the captains of the London militia, the "Whitecoats", to desert Mary's service near Rochester. A contemporary writer, John Proctor, described the captains changing sides at Hospital Hill at Strood.

Noailles thought the executions of Wyatt's supporters in February 1554 after the rebellion failed would be counter-productive for the Spanish marriage plans, and came to realise that the opposition had been silenced. Wyatt had implicated Cleutin in his confession. In France, the Constable Montmorency had to defend to the activities of Noailles and Cleutin to the English ambassador Nicholas Wotton. In April, Noailles still thought that French funding might rebuild an opposition. On 7 May, Noailles spoke to Mary and her council about the fleet of ships that would bring Philip as a potential threat to French shipping, and the meeting concluded with angry words on both sides, and the impression that the French intended war. Noailles had to offer apologies and retractions, but continued to try and find means to hinder the wedding plans.

Noailles tried to maintain the favour of the Lady Elizabeth, who had recently been released from the Tower of London. Noailles sent her a gift of apples, but his messenger was arrested at Richmond Palace.

=== Messieurs Noailles ===
His youngest brother, Gilles de Noailles, served as a diplomatic agent. Their brother François de Noailles was ambassador in London from 6 November 1556 to 21 June 1557. A selection of their diplomatic correspondence was published in five volumes by René Aubert de Vertot in 1763 as Ambassades de Messieurs Noailles en Angleterre.

== Marriage ==
His wife was Jeanne de Gontaut, who following his death, became a lady-in-waiting to Catherine de Medici.
