= River Devon, Clackmannanshire =

Tributary of the River Forth, Scotland

River Devon
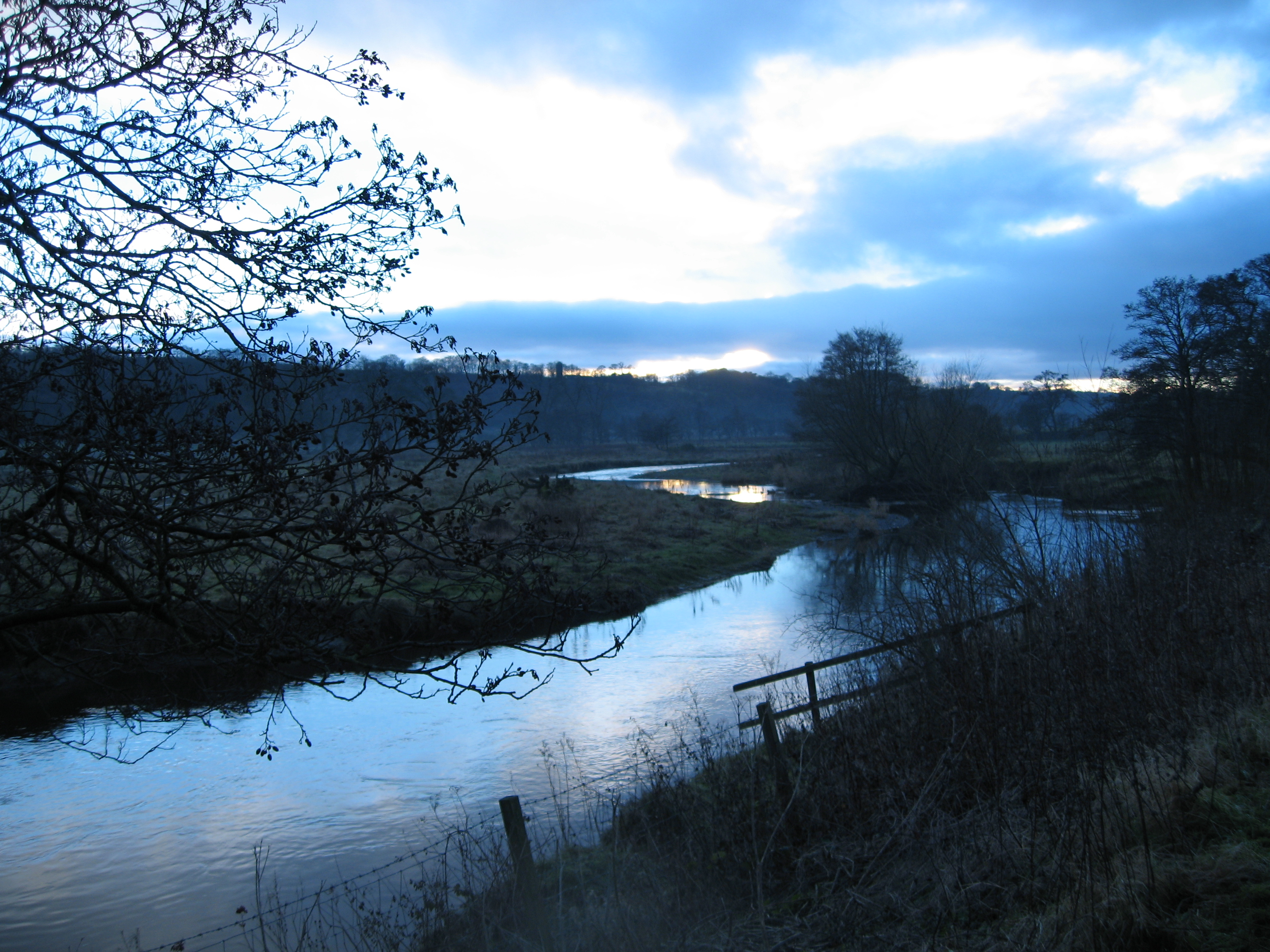
- The Devon at dusk, near Tillicoultry
- Native name: Duibhe (Scottish Gaelic)

Location
- Country: United Kingdom
- Constituent country: Scotland

Physical characteristics
- Mouth: River Forth
  - coordinates: 56.12067°N 3.85312°W

The River Devon (formerly Dovan, Scottish Gaelic: Duibhe) is a tributary of the River Forth in Clackmannanshire and Perth & Kinross, Scotland.

== Geography and hydrology ==
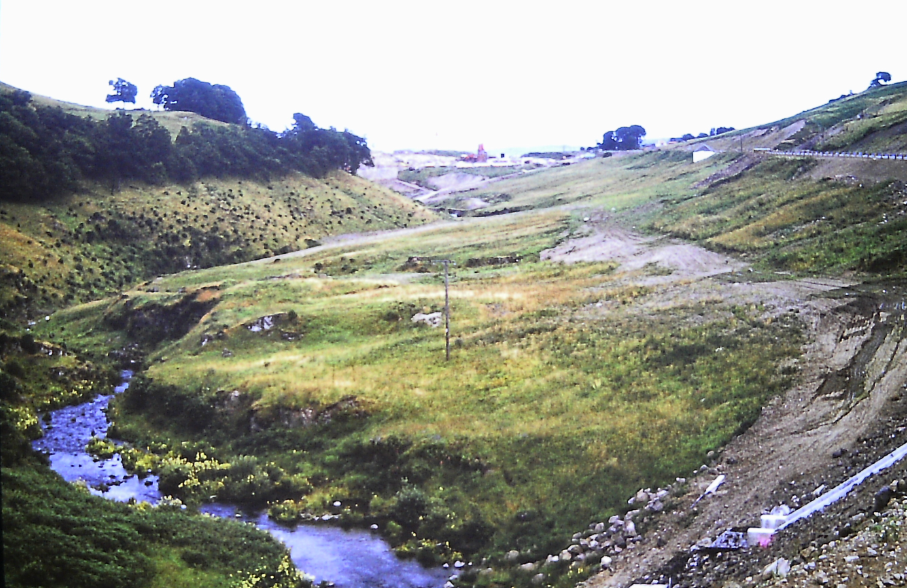
Creation of Castlehill Reservoir, Glendevon c.1971

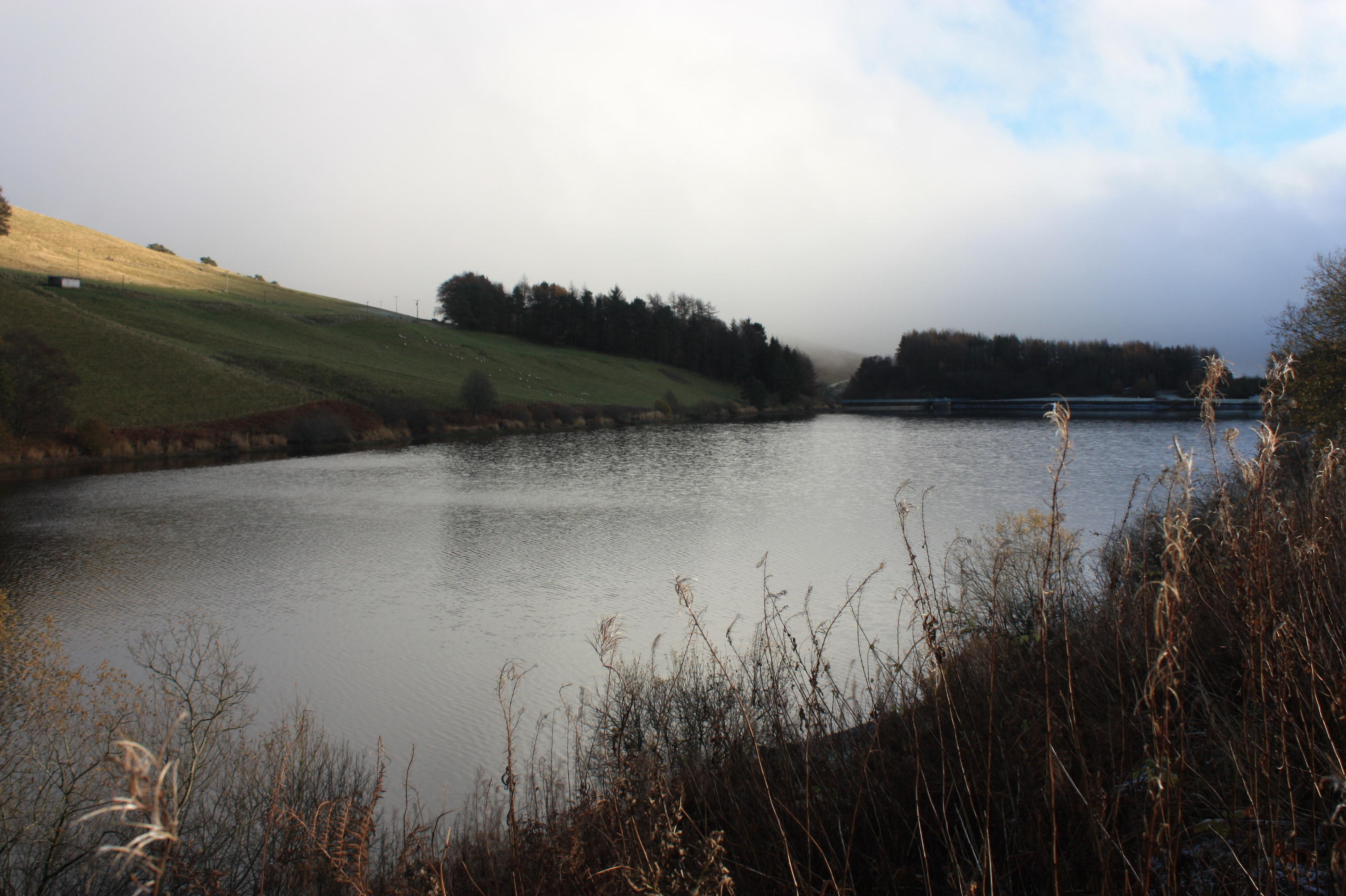
Castlehill Reservoir in Glen Devon

The source of the river is Blairdenon Hill in the Ochils at an altitude of 1,800 feet (550 m). Upper areas have been dammed, creating Upper Glendevon, Lower Glendevon and Castlehill reservoirs. The Devon then flows east and southeast through Glendevon, turning southwest at Crook of Devon and then continuing westwards, meandering across its flood plain along the foot of the Ochil Hills. It reaches the River Forth to the west of Alloa at the small village of Cambus.

The UK Centre for Ecology & Hydrology, (part of UK's Natural Environment Research Council, NERC) describes the catchment area thus: "Headwaters are steep; lower valley is broad and very flat. Bedrock extrusive igneous rocks, 50% overlain by superficial deposits. Land use arable in the valley; grassland in headwaters, some forest." The catchment covers an area of 181 km2.

== Glen Devon ==
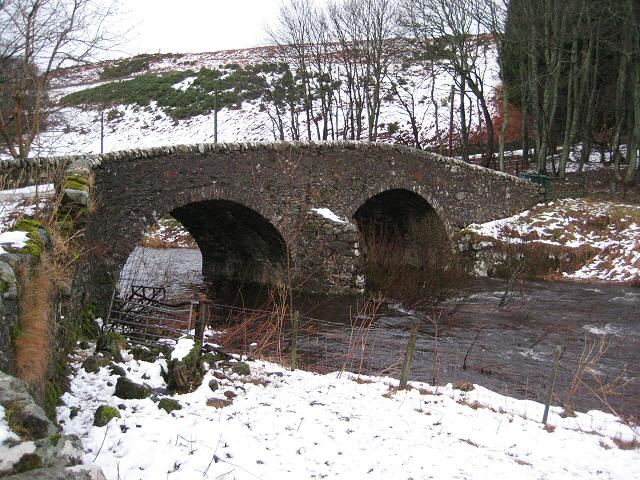
18th century Bridge at Glendevon

Glen Devon stretches from the junction of the river Devon with the dramatic Glen Eagles (a perfect U-valley) southwards to the Yetts of Muckhart where the landscape then opens into a wide flood plain. The natural landscape was greatly altered by the construction of the Castlehill Reservoir which was built around 1975.

The central village, Glendevon, lies north of the reservoir and has for 70 years been a holiday destination for holiday cabins. Glen Devon Castle was largely destroyed by fire c. 1970. Its arched entranceway still exists at the north end of the reservoir. The village contains the old coach hostelry, The Tormaukin, which still survives as a restaurant. The church and manse lie north of the main village. An 18th-century bridge crosses the Devon to the south of the church.

The high-level reservoirs are named Glenquey, Glensherup, after the Devon's high-level tributaries, and upper and lower Frandy reservoir. All were built by German PoWs in the Second World War and are used for trout fishing.

== History and culture ==
During the Scottish Reformation, William Kirkcaldy destroyed the bridge at Tullibody in attempt to prevent French troops retreating to the Siege of Leith at the end of January 1560. However, the French took down the roof of Tullibody Kirk to bridge the Devon.

The Devon was surveyed by James Watt in 1766, who claimed that by deepening the river bed it might be navigable as far as Dollar. The estimated cost of such a project was £2000.

Two songs The Banks of the Devon and Fairest Maid on Devon Banks were written in 1787 by Robert Burns, which recall Charlotte Hamilton of Mauchline whom he had met at nearby Harviestoun estate.

The Devon Valley Railway was built along the strath.

== Flooding ==
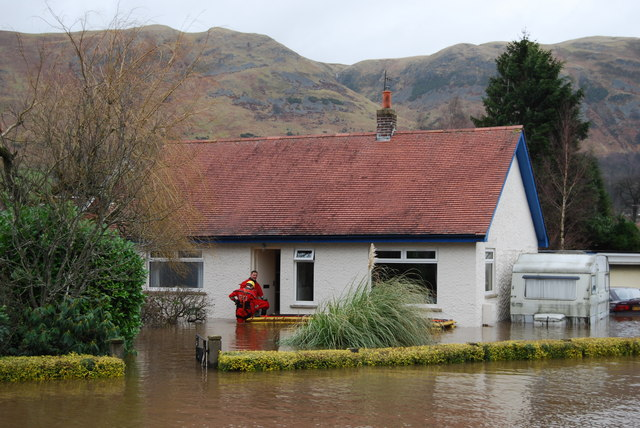
Flooded House in Tillicoultry, 26 January 2008

Clackmannanshire Council has recognised the threat of flooding along the Devon and has worked to address the issue on its own account and in partnership with others, including WWF-Scotland. Works undertaken on the Devon catchment include willow walling, riverside woodland and the blocking of wetland drains.

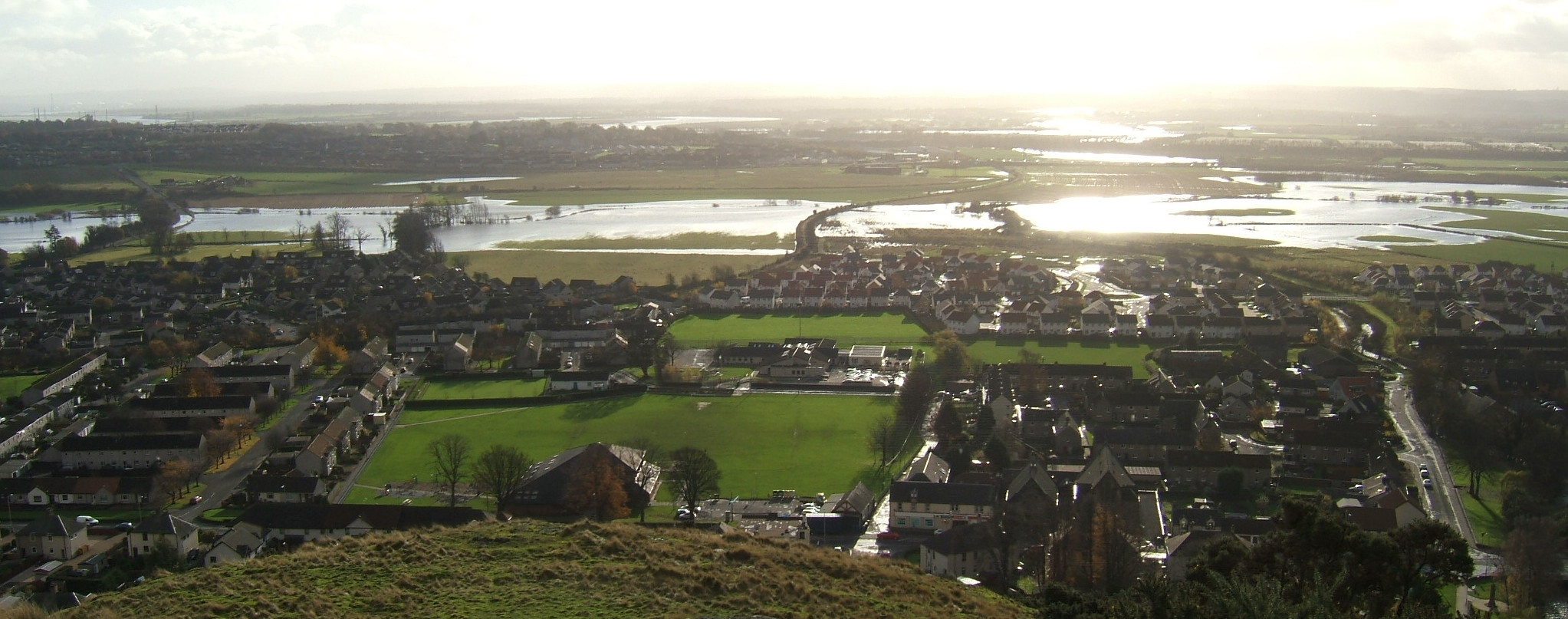
River Devon in flood near Menstrie, 20 November 2009

In January 2008 the Devon catchment area was 'Very Wet'. Land became saturated and rainfall resulted in run-off into rivers, reaching the river system very quickly. River flows in the region were 'Exceptionally High'. Upstream, all the Ochil reservoirs were full with Castlehill reservoir overflowing for all of that month. The flood at the upstream gauge at Castlehill was the second highest recorded. Further downstream, the water level recorded at Glenochil was the highest since records began in 1956.

Over the period of 25–26 January 2008, residential and commercial properties in part of Tillicoultry were inundated. The extent of flooding was greater than had been experienced in the past and the Council appointed specialist hydrological consultants to investigate the contributory factors and advise on measures available to minimise or eliminate any future occurrence.

In November 2008 and again in November 2009 extensive flooding occurred in the Hillfoots making several road bridges across the river impassable. No houses were damaged on those two occasions.

River level data at Glenochil gauging station (hourly, automatic) are now available from SEPA on-line.
