= William Kirkcaldy of Grange =

Scottish soldier (c. 1520 – 1573)

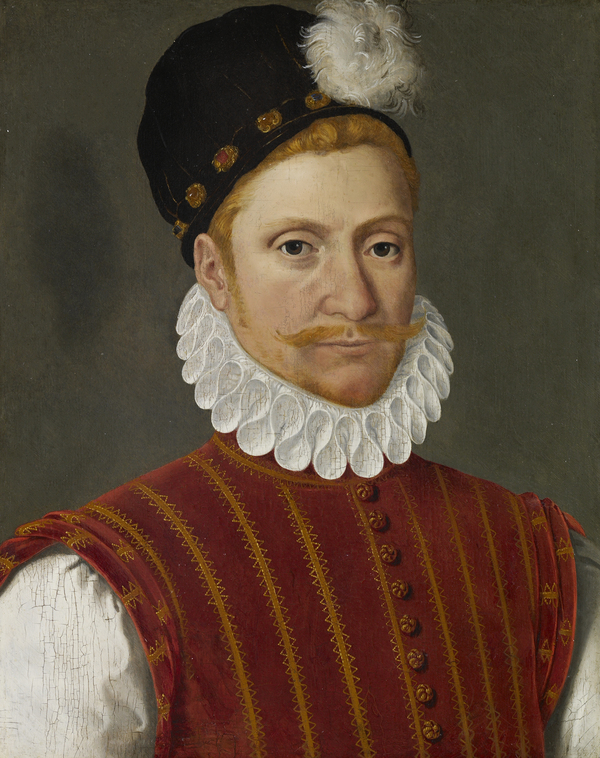
Kirkcaldy of Grange, 1555–56, by François Clouet.

Sir William Kirkcaldy of Grange (c. 1520 – 3 August 1573) was a Scottish politician and soldier who fought for the Scottish Reformation. He ended his career holding Edinburgh castle on behalf of Mary, Queen of Scots and was hanged at the conclusion of a long siege.

== Family ==
William Kirkcaldy of Grange held lands at Hallyards Castle in Fife. William's father, James Kirkcaldy of Grange (died 1556), was Treasurer of Scotland from 1537 to 1543 and a determined opponent of Cardinal Beaton, for whose murder in 1546 William and James were partly responsible.

William Kirkcaldy married Margaret Learmonth, a sister of Sir Patrick Learmonth of Dairsie and Provost of St Andrews, and George Learmonth of Balcomie. Kirkcaldy's heir was a nephew.

A few days before Kirkcaldy's execution in August 1573, Ninian Cockburn reported that he had a child with a young woman. Kirkcaldy wrote a letter in code to the woman from his captivity, which was intercepted and decoded. Later, Mary, Queen of Scots, corresponded in cipher with the French diplomat Michel de Castelnau about this woman and her daughter. Mary arranged to give the daughter 40 crowns in 1582. She may have been the Susanna Kirkcaldy who attended Mary's funeral at Peterborough in 1587.

== War with England, service with France, and the Reformation ==
William Kirkcaldy, with other courtiers, was a witness to the instrument made at Falkland Palace at the deathbed of James V of Scotland in 1542 which Cardinal Beaton used to attempt to claim the Regency of Scotland. However, he participated in the Cardinal's murder in May 1546, and when St Andrews Castle surrendered to the French in July the following year Kirkcaldy was sent as a prisoner to Normandy. He escaped in 1550.

Kirkcaldy was employed in France as a secret agent by the advisers of Edward VI, being known in the ciphers as "Corax". He received an english pension of £100. Later he served in the French army, where he gained a lasting reputation for skill and bravery. Kirkcaldy was in London in December 1553, discussing border issues with the French ambassador, Antoine de Noailles.

The sentence passed on Kirkcaldy for his part in Beaton's murder was removed in 1556. Returning to Scotland in 1557, he became prominent by killing Ralph Eure, the brother of the Governor of Berwick upon Tweed, in a duel. As a Protestant he was one of the leaders of the Lords of the Congregation in their struggle with the Regent of Scotland, Mary of Guise. Kirkcaldy fought the French troops in Fife and they destroyed his house at Halyards. In January 1560 he took down part of Tullibody bridge to delay the return to Stirling of French troops commanded by Henri Cleutin.

=== Mary, Darnley, and Bothwell ===
Kirkcaldy was knighted at Holyrood Palace by Mary, Queen of Scots on 8 February 1562 during the festivities at the wedding of the queen's half-brother Lord James Stewart and Agnes Keith. He opposed Queen Mary's marriage with Lord Darnley, and was associated with her half-brother, Lord James, now Earl of Moray, during the Chaseabout Raid. For his participation in this rebellion, he was forced for a short time to seek refuge in England. He returned to Scotland, and was an accessory to the murder of Rizzio. He had no share in Darnley's assassination.

Kirkcaldy was opposed to Mary's marriage with Bothwell and regarded the proceedings in the Scottish Parliament with dismay. He wrote to the Earl of Bedford, an English diplomat, that Mary did not care if she lost France, England and Scotland for Bothwell's sake, and Mary had said she would go with him to the world's end in a petticoat;

sho caris not to lose France Ingland and her owne countrie for him, and sall go with him to the warldes ende in ane white peticote or she leve him.

Elizabeth however disapproved of Kirkcaldy's opinions of a fellow queen as if she were "worse than any common woman". Yet Kirkcaldy was one of the lords who banded themselves together to rescue Mary after her marriage with Bothwell. After the Carberry Hill the queen surrendered to Kirkcaldy. Bothwell escaped and Kirkcaldy sailed in pursuit with William Murray of Tullibardine to Shetland. He was made Lord High Admiral of Scotland for the time. Some of their ships came from Dundee, including the James, the Primrose, and the Robert. Edinburgh town council lent him their guns. He was determined to capture Bothwell and declared to the Earl of Bedford, Governor of Berwick:

Albeit I be na gud seeman, I promes unto your lordschip, gyf I may anes enconter with hym eyther be see or land, he sall eyther carre me with hym, or ellis I sall bryng hym dead or quik to Edinbrucht.

However, they did not meet, Kirkcaldy's ship, the Lion, ran aground north of Bressay. The Unicorn, belonging to Andrew Lamb of Leith, was also lost. Sir James Balfour surrendered Edinburgh Castle to Regent Moray, and William Kirkcaldy was appointed as keeper.

After Mary escaped from imprisonment at Lochleven Castle, his military command was mainly responsible for her defeat at the Battle of Langside. Kirkcaldy seems to have believed that a peaceful settlement with Mary was possible. He was influenced by William Maitland of Lethington. In September 1569 Kirkcaldy released Maitland by a stratagem from his confinement in Edinburgh Castle. Kirkcaldy was now vehemently suspected by his former allies.

== The "Lang Siege" of Edinburgh Castle ==
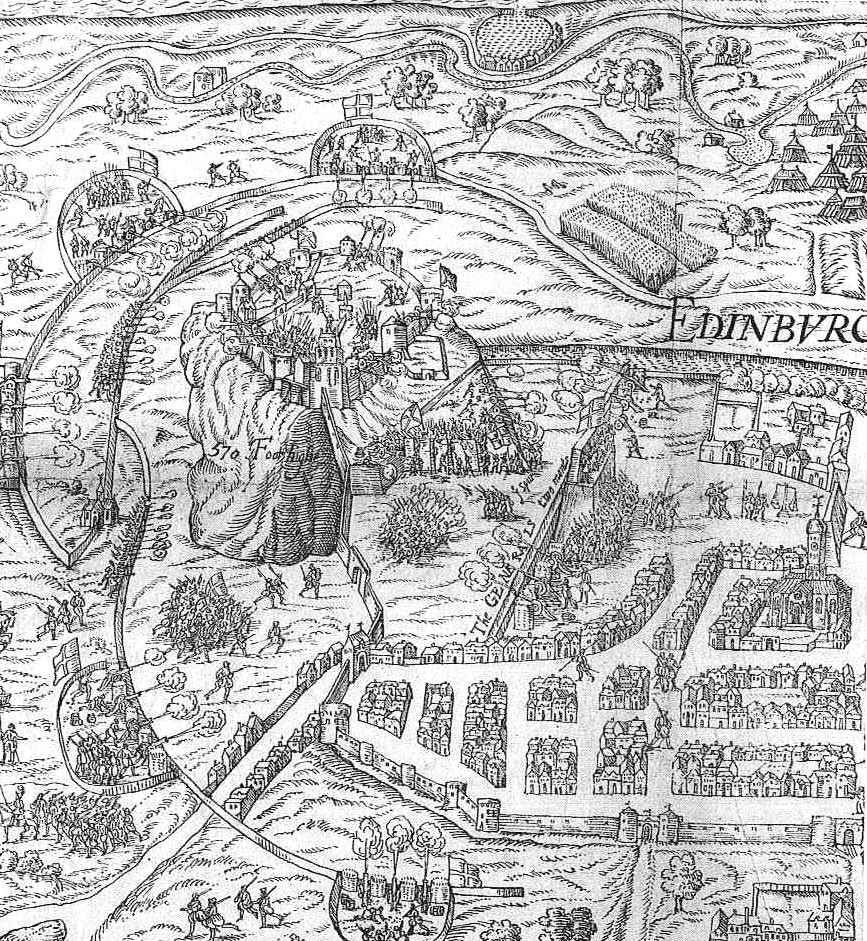
Woodcut of the "lang siege" of Edinburgh Castle showing the English intervention, Holinshed's Chronicle.

After the murder of Regent Moray in January 1570, William Kirkcaldy of Grange ranged himself definitely among the friends of the imprisoned queen. Grange attended a sermon at St Giles on 24 December 1570 with Agnes Keith, Countess of Moray, and heard John Knox criticise him with an allusion to the Biblical story of Naboth's vineyard. Defying Regent Lennox, Grange began to strengthen the fortifications of Edinburgh castle and town, of which he was captain and Provost, and now held for Mary. On 2 March 1571, Grange organised a military exercise, with some of his troops pretending to be an English army attacking Edinburgh Castle.

Kirkcaldy forcibly released one of his supporters from imprisonment in Edinburgh's tolbooth, a step which led to an altercation with his former friend John Knox, who called him a murderer and throat-cutter. He arrested some leading burgesses on 29 April 1571. The King's party established their headquarters in Leith. The subsequent period has become known as the "Wars between Leith and Edinburgh." Kirkcaldy began to strengthen the spur fortification at the entrance of the castle, and in May built fortifications in the town, on the Royal Mile and on St Giles Kirk. In October 1571 the town council established itself in Leith, and Grange's men fortified Edinburgh by blocking the ends of streets and closes and burning houses on the outskirts of the city, such as Potterrow. The "lang siege" of Edinburgh castle began in mid-October, when Regent Mar brought artillery from Dumbarton and Stirling Castle.

=== Raising money for Mary's cause ===
Grange received supplies and money from France, England, and the Spanish Netherlands where George Seton, 7th Lord Seton negotiated with the Duke of Alva. John Chisholm, Master of the Scottish Artillery, obtained money and arms from the exiled Bishop of Glasgow and Charles IX of France. He sailed from Dieppe in June 1571 but was captured at North Queensferry.

Grange established a mint in the castle to coin silver with the goldsmiths James Mosman and James Cockie, and raised loans by pawning jewellery belonging to Mary, Queen of Scots. On 27 January 1573, William's brother, James Kirkcaldy arrived at Blackness Castle with arms and money from France, but the castle was besieged by Regent Morton, and James Kirkcaldy was captured.

Early in 1573, Kirkcaldy refused to come to an agreement with Regent Morton because the terms of peace set out by the "Pacification of Perth" did not include a section of his friends. As it became clear that surrender was inevitable, Grange sent his cousin Henry Echlin of Pittadro, to Regent Morton to discuss the handover of the Honours of Scotland, the remainder of Mary's jewels, and the jewels taken as pledges for loans. Morton did not engage with Grange's offer.

=== Surrender of Edinburgh Castle ===
After the Pacification of Perth, English troops and artillery arrived to help Regent Morton and the King's party. On 28 May 1573 the castle surrendered. The English commander Sir William Drury took Grange to his lodgings at Robert Gourlay's House and then to Leith. During this time Master Archibald Douglas negotiated with Grange and Drury over the jewels belonging to Mary, Queen of Scots. Several jewels were returned to Drury at Leith.

After a week at Leith, Grange was handed over to Regent Morton and imprisoned in Holyroodhouse. Strenuous efforts were made to save Kirkcaldy from the vengeance of his enemies, but they were unavailing; Knox had prophesied that he would be hanged, and he was hanged on 3 August 1573.

A year later, one of Grange's letters came to light, which mentioned the jewels Mary, Queen of Scots had left behind in Scotland, and that Drury had taken some as a pledge for a loan of £600. Grange's wife, Margaret Learmonth, was in hiding but her whereabouts became known in June 1574 after she was summoned to return jewels.

== Posthumous rehabilitation ==
On 15 July 1581, James VI restored his lands to his heirs, giving a long recitation of Kirkcaldy's service, mentioning a single combat in 1557 while Scotland was at war with England, his support of the Scottish Reformation, and his conduct at Carberry Hill and pursuit of Bothwell;

Schir Williame Kirkcaldie of Grange, quhen weiris stude betuix this realme and Ingland, did sic vailyeand and acceptable service at mony common jeopardis in thai weiris, and als did sa vailyeantlie and manfullie in ane singular combat according to the law of armeis that it meritis perpetuall commendatioun, lyke als alsua he wes ane of the maist notabill instrumentis usit be almichtie God amangis the nobilitie and gentilmen of this realme in suppressing the idolatrus religioun, ...
als as ane of the maist bent to the revealing of the odious murthour of his hienes derrest fader and offerit his body to ony of honest degre that would tak the defence of the erle of Bothwell, and to have had revenge followit him upoune the seyis to Zetland, quhair Schir Williame wes than schipbrokkin in greit hasert, ...

Sir William Kirkcaldy of Grange, when wars stood between this realm and England, did such valiant and acceptable service at many battles in those wars, and also did so valiantly and manfully in a single combat according to the Laws of Arms that it merits perpetual commendation, and likewise he was one of the most notable instruments used by Almighty God amongst the nobility and gentlemen of this realm in suppressing idolatrous religion, ... and one of the most keen to reveal the odious murder of the king's father and offered his body to any of honest degree that would take the defence of the Earl of Bothwell (at Carberry), and to have revenge followed him by sea to Shetland, where Sir William in great danger shipwrecked ...

William's heir was his nephew, also William Kirkcaldy, son of his brother Master James Kirkcaldy.
