= Pedro de Negro =

Spanish soldier (??–1551)

Sir Pedro de Negro or Sir Pedro Negro (died 1551) was a Spanish soldier who fought for Henry VIII and Edward VI of England in France and Scotland.

== Career and knighthood ==
Pedro de Negro commanded calvalrymen armed with muskets during the war between England and Scotland now known as the Rough Wooing. English sources sometimes name him as "Petro Negro" or "Peter Negroo". The Scottish author John Lesley, writing in Latin, called him "Petrus Niger" and linked him with another Spanish captain Julián Romero.

The war began in 1544, sparked by plans for Mary, Queen of Scots to marry Edward VI. Some of the leather horse armour used by the English cavalry was made by an Italian specialist Niccolo da Modena. Both sides made use of foreign military expertise. By April 1547, Pedro de Negro received a pension and annuity from the English exchequer of £100 yearly.

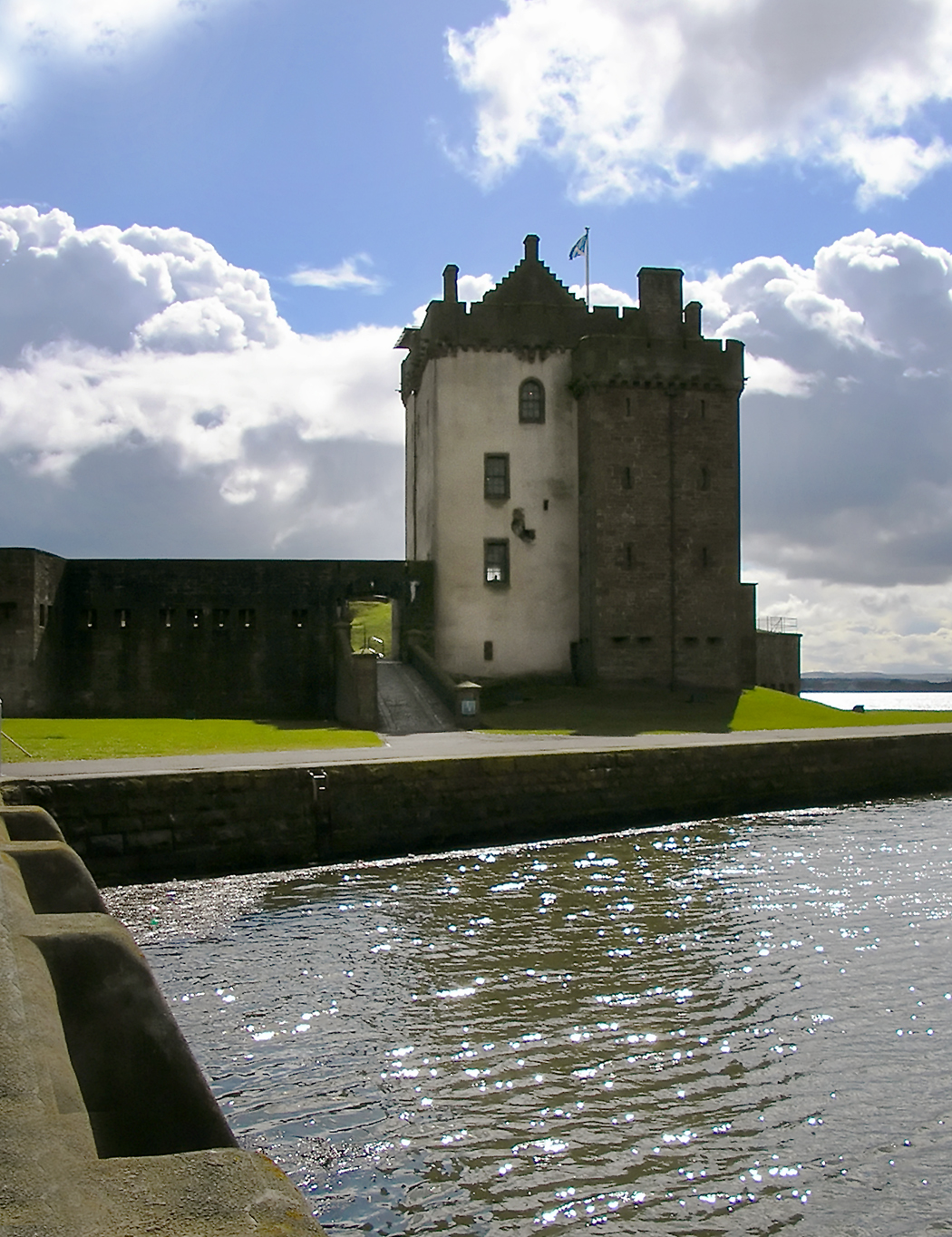
Pedro de Negro and his Spanish soldiers joined the English garrison at Broughty Castle in 1549

According to William Patten, Pedro de Negro was knighted by the Duke of Somerset following the battle of Pinkie and the capture of Leith on 28 September 1547 at Roxburgh Castle. Two other Spanish captains were knighted, Christpher Diaz and Alonso de Ville. Another source lists Pedro Negro and Alonso de Villeseige among knights made by the Earl of Warwick at Berwick-upon-Tweed. On New Year's Day, Edward VI gave him a half mark (6s-8d) as a reward.

== Siege of Haddington ==
An English army occupied and fortified the town of Haddington, East Lothian as a foothold in Scotland. Haddington is near to the coast and could be supplied by sea and land. French and Scottish forces surrounded Haddington. In June 1548, the English commander Grey of Wilton chose Pedro de Negro, and 100 Spanish soldiers from Pedro de Gamboa's command to reinforce the garrison. On 29 June 1548 Pedro Negro and the Spanish troops tried unsuccessfully to cross enemy lines into the town. In July, French troops prepared ladders for an assault on the town. The English army outside the town made plans to get supplies to the defenders.

On 7 July 1548, an English soldier Thomas Holcroft described a plan, that 150 of Pedro de Gamboa's mounted arquebusiers, commanded by Pedro de Negro, and other soldiers would ride through French lines from Linton bridge to relieve the siege. Some of the force would ride back to the English camp, while others would join the garrison in Haddington, after being "well-instructed how to work for their defence within". The Scottish leader, Regent Arran, ordered the gentlemen of Lothian to assemble and block the approach to Haddington on the River Tyne east of the Abbey of St Mary at Haddington. According to a Spanish chronicle now known as the Chronicle of Henry VIII, Pedro de Negro successfully broke through. The chronicle relates that the Spanish and English cavalrymen rode into Haddington carrying bags of gunpowder. Rather than return to Linton through enemy lines, they slaughtered their own horses outside the town gates. The rotting horses in the summer heat deterred French attacks. After the French and Scottish had withdrawn, Pedro de Negro buried them in three pits.

Somerset told a French diplomat Odet de Selve about the exploit, or "belle hystoyre" of 400 arquebusiers who each carried 20 pounds of powder through the Scottish lines into the town. The Scottish records suggest that the siege was not abandoned at this time. Robert Hamilton, the son of Robert Hamilton of Briggis, hauled the cannon called "thrawyn-mouth" from Dunbar Castle to batter the town. A cavalry force led by Thomas Palmer was defeated by the French on 16 July, a loss described by Ulpian Fulwell in his Flower of Fame (London, 1575), and by John Knox in his History.

At the end of July, the French diplomat Odet de Selve reported that the delivery of the bags of gunpowder and the efforts of "Pietro Negro" and "Captain Windent" were the talk of the court in London. However, some doubt remains about the date of their exploit, Thomas Fisher wrote on 30 July that Baynbridge was preparing a second convoy of men and powder, while a coded note from James Wilsford, the Captain of Haddington, dated 3 August, discusses a plan with horsemen carrying powder as a future event, and Wilsford says the town could not support their horses.

In February or March 1549 Pedro Negro and his band of Spanish soldiers joined John Luttrell at Broughty Castle near Dundee. In July Luttrell complained that the Spanish soldiers had not yet received pay or clothing. A note made in January 1550 records that a soldier called Hans de Froement borrowed £6 from a Juan de Cosio to give to Pedro Negro. He hoped that Luttrell would ensure Juan de Cosio was repaid. Broughty surrendered and Luttrell was captured by the English soon after, on 12 February 1550.

== Pedro and the taking of Captain Julian ==
Captain Julián Romero was stationed at Cheswick in Northumberland in May 1549 and "Pero Negro" was close by at Kyloe and Fenwick near Lindisfarne. A chronicle of the reign of Mary, Queen of Scots mentions the defeat and capture of Spanish soldiers led by "Julius Romanus", Julián Romero, near Coldingham in the spring of 1549.

In September 1549 Pedro was blamed for the capture by the Scots of Captain Julián Romero by other Spanish soldiers and Captain Gamboa. The controversy was mentioned by the courtier Richard Scudamore. A feud amongst the Spanish soldiers led to Gamboa's murder in London.

=== Lady Home and the Moor ===
Marion Haliburton, Lady Home returned to Hume Castle after it was recaptured from the English. She wrote in favour of the Spanish cavalrymen (who owed money to her villagers) to Mary of Guise in March 1549, that they behaved "like noble men, and also the Mour, he is as sharp a man as rides, beseeching your grace to be a good princess unto him". The "Mour" or "Moor" seems to have been an African officer amongst the Spanish cavalry.

== London ==
Pedro Negro died in London from the "sweating sickness" on 14 July 1551. In his will, he names his friend Captain Christopher Diaz his sole executor; he leaves his entire property to his (unnamed) son when he comes of age, apart from a bequest to a putative daughter in Italy: "And yf by fortune that a daughter that I have in Ittaly to be approved to be my daughter then I will she have Fiftie ducats".

His surname "Negro" has been interpreted to mean he was of African descent. It has also been suggested that he belonged to a family called "Negro" from Genoa, many of whom settled in Spain and Portugal.

== See also ==
- Becoming Elizabeth
