= Broughty Castle =

Castle in Dundee, Scotland

Coordinates: 56°27′46″N 2°52′13″W

Siege of Broughty Castle
- Part of Anglo-Scottish Wars; Rough Wooing
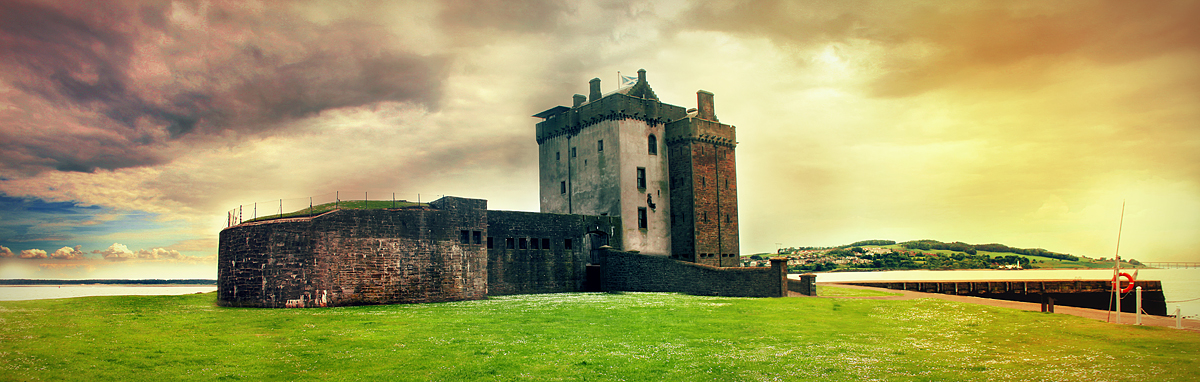
- Broughty Castle
Date	1547–1550
Location	Broughty Ferry, Dundee, Scotland
Result	Scottish/French victory

Belligerents
Kingdom of Scotland; Kingdom of France	Kingdom of England

Commanders and leaders
Earl of Arran; Earl of Argyll; James Doig of Dunrobin; Paul de Thermes; Henri Cleutin	Sir Andrew Dudley; Sir John Luttrell

Strength
Unknown	300 (at final assault); 5 warships

Casualties and losses
50 (final assault)	Unknown

Broughty Castle is a historic castle on the banks of the River Tay in Broughty Ferry, Dundee, Scotland. It was completed around 1495, although the site was earlier fortified in 1454, when George Douglas, 4th Earl of Angus, received permission to build on the site. His son, Archibald Douglas, 5th Earl of Angus, was coerced into ceding the castle to the crown. The main tower house forming the centre of the castle with four floors was built by Andrew, 2nd Lord Gray, who was granted the castle in 1490. The structure is designated a scheduled monument.

Broughty Castle
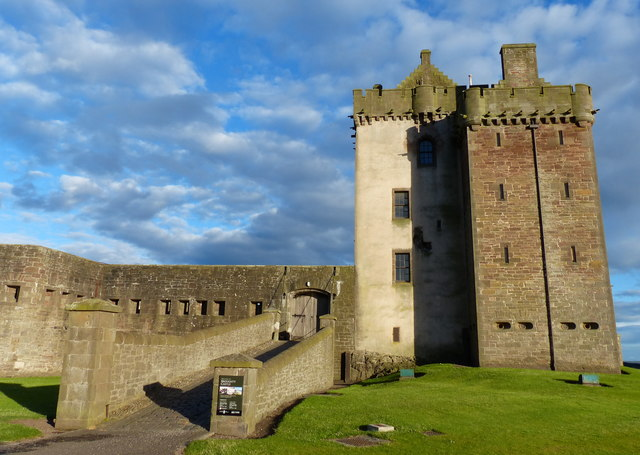
- Broughty Castle in 2017

General information
- Location: Broughty Ferry, Dundee, Scotland

Technical details
- Material: Stone

Scheduled monument
- Official name: Broughty Castle
- Designated: 30 November 1981
- Reference no.: SM90043

== History ==
=== 16th century: The Rough Wooing ===
The castle saw military action during the 16th-century War of the Rough Wooing. After the battle of Pinkie in September 1547, it was surrendered by purchase to the English by its owner, Lord Gray of Foulis. A messenger from the castle, Rinyon (Ninian) Cockburn, who spoke to the English supreme commander the Duke of Somerset before the castle was rendered was given a £4 reward. The Scottish keeper, Henry Durham, was rewarded with an English pension, income from the fishing, and an import/export licence. Durham later lent the English commander £138. William Patten, the English writer who accompanied Somerset, noted the castle's strategic importance;

"it standeth in such sort at the mouth of the river Tay, that being gotten, both Dundee and St. John's Town (Perth), and many other towns else shall become subject to this hold or be compelled to forgo their use of the river."

The position of the old castle itself was advantageous to modern warfare, as it was discovered that the swift river current made naval bombardment impractical. Soon after taking possession, the English garrison further fortified Broughty by building a ditch across the landward side of the castle's promontory. Edward Clinton began the refortification, on the advice of an Italian engineer, Master John Rossetti, and left 100 men guarded by three ships. William Bruce of Earlshall feared the English would build an outpost on the south say of the Tay. The garrison was first led by Sir Andrew Dudley, the Duke of Northumberland's brother, who hoped to distribute Tyndale's Bible in Dundee. Andrew Dudley wrote in October 1547; "as for soldiers, there was never man had so weak a company, given all to eating and drinking and slothfulness", although, "the house stands well." His garrison included Italian and Spanish soldiers, and he hoped that Grey of Wilton would send him an expert French surgeon. The town of Dundee agreed to support the garrison and resist the Governor of Scotland, Regent Arran on 27 October 1547. The Constable of Dundee, John Scrimgeour, and the baillies and council signed the agreement, although under the duress of Dudley's two gunships.

The Earl of Argyll tried to capture the castle on 22 November 1547 and again in January 1548 with 150 men led by the soldier Duncan Dundas, without success. Thomas Wyndham brought two more ships in December 1547 and burnt Balmerino Abbey on Christmas Day. On 12 January 1548, one hundred matchlock guns were delivered from Berwick, with powder flasks, matches, touch boxes, and bullet moulds. Sir Thomas Palmer and the Italian military engineer "Master John", Giovanni di Rossetti, who was made master of ordnance at Broughty, made plans to improve the fortifications, noting that the castle was overlooked by a nearby hill. In February 1548, 100 workmen were sent from Berwick and new armaments including falcon guns, cannonballs for demi-culverins, bows, bills, pikes, cresset lights, cables and anchors. Palmer set to work fortifying the hill in February and also considered ambitious plans to build a citadel in Dundee with the demolition of the church and tolbooth. Andrew Dudley waited for lead to make a new platform (probably for artillery) on the castle tower in March 1548.

Andrew Dudley was succeeded by John Luttrell who had been the commander at Inchcolm. On 11 May 1548, the English commander at Haddington, Grey of Wilton wrote to Luttrell that he could not expect more supplies because of the expected French fleet. Grey of Wilton warned him against Scottish assassins in June, and Somerset required him to dismiss the German mercenaries in his command. There was some relief for Luttrell, as Lord Methven took away the guns of the Scottish counter-battery for redeployment at the Siege of Haddington on 6 June 1548.

Meanwhile, Luttrell had been ordered to build a new fortification on an adjacent site. In November he wrote to Somerset describing the progress of this work explaining that the ramparts made from turf were unstable and could not be strengthened. Luttrell said his enemies would not need guns; "for theye shall fynde hytt fallen downe redy to ther handys." In December 1548, Patrick, Lord Gray of Foulis, was summoned to account for his treasons against the Government of Scotland, and although the French commanders argued for his execution, he was eventually pardoned at Regent Arran's command.

In February 1549 Luttrell was joined by Pedro de Negro and his band of Spanish soldiers. In July Luttrell complained that the Spanish soldiers had not yet received pay or clothing.

Thomas Wyndham and his nephew Luttrell's activities on the Forth were called into question in November 1549, and the Earl of Rutland was required to investigate whether one of the ships they had seized was a lawful prize. On Christmas Day 1549, Mary of Guise held a conference at Stirling Castle with her guests, and they agreed that more French guns could be brought to besiege Broughty. Robert Hamilton of Briggis directed labourers called "pioneers" to dig entrenchments for the guns.

Twelve English ships arrived to support the defenders and it was 12 February 1550 before the French and Scots managed to recapture Broughty. Mary of Guise watched the successful assault on 6 February 1550 from a vantage point across the Tay. Paul de Thermes led the French troops, 240 were injured and 50 killed. The garrison surrendered six days later at midnight. James Dog of Dunrobin claimed Luttrell as his prisoner and his papers were captured. His ransom of £1000 Scots was raised on 16 May 1550 as an exchange for the sons of George Douglas of Pittendreich and the Master of Semple who were prisoners in England. (George Douglas's son would later rule Scotland as Regent Morton.) Luttrell was promptly re-arrested for debts to a Dundee merchant, Robert Craig, but Regent Arran paid the merchant in September, and Luttrell was allowed home.

=== 17th century: War of the Three Kingdoms ===
The castle was attacked again, in 1651, by General Monck and his Parliamentary army during the Wars of the Three Kingdoms. On this occasion the Royalist defenders fled without a fight. After 1666, when the Gray family sold the castle, it gradually became more ruinous.

=== 19th century ===
In 1846 the castle was bought by the Edinburgh and Northern Railway Company in order to build an adjacent harbour for their railway ferry. In 1855 the castle was acquired by the War Office with the intention of using it to defend the harbour from the Russians. In 1860 renewed fears of a French invasion led the War Office to rebuild and fortify the site. The site was rebuilt according to the designs of Robert Rowand Anderson. The walls of the main courtyard were rebuilt and new wings and courtyards were added to the tower. A caponier was added along the south-east side of the courtyard. Emplacements for nine large guns were also constructed. A small enclosure on the west side of the courtyard was also built. During the First World War, the castle battery mounted two 4.7-inch Quick Firing guns.

From 1886 to 1887 a range was built to house submarine miners to the east of the castle. In an emergency these would lay mines in the Tay Estuary to damage enemy shipping. In 1889–1891 a magazine was built within the western enclosure which also led to a major remodelling of the gun emplacements. The castle remained in military use until 1932, and again between 1939 and 1949. The last defence-related alteration was made in the Second World War when a defence post was built within the top of the main tower.

=== 20th century ===
During the 20th century, the castle served as the headquarters for the Tay Division Submarine Miners Royal Engineers (Volunteers) and housed associated military buildings and magazines into the early 1900s. Following the end of military operations in 1949, the Battery Observation Post and related fortifications were decommissioned, with subsequent demolition of parts of the outer battery in 1967 to make way for recreational facilities like a crazy golf course.

In 1969, the castle was repurposed as a public museum under Dundee City Council, and is now operated by Leisure & Culture Dundee.

Throughout the 1970s and 1980s, Broughty Castle Museum underwent a series of modest but important improvements to refresh visitor displays and facilities. In the early 1970s, new galleries were introduced showcasing local maritime and whaling heritage—especially the “Local and Whaling History” exhibits from around 1970, followed by the “Seashore Gallery” installed in 1976.

By the mid-1990s, the facility saw further enhancements: a low-cost update to the Military Gallery occurred in 1994, and a £30,000 allocation in the 2001–02 capital plan was secured to support the museum’s ongoing redevelopment through a combination of Heritage Lottery funding and Council investment.

In 1993, groundwork for modern floodlighting involved trenches laid across Castle Green and within the courtyard, signalling a growing emphasis on visitor experience and site illumination.

=== 21st century ===
In February 2024, the castle was named in a list of sites facing possible closure due to proposed budget cuts by Dundee City Council, alongside Mills Observatory and Caird Park golf course. The announcement was met with significant public concern and media attention, leading to the proposals being reconsidered later in the month after funding was allocated to Leisure and Culture Dundee to keep the facilities running.

However, closure was again considered in May 2024, when a public consultation was launched to determine the long-term future of the three venues. A petition opposing the plans received thousands of signatures. In November 2024, officers from Dundee City Council recommended the continued operation of Mills Observatory due to increased visitor numbers, but proposed the closure of Caird Park golf course in April 2025 and Broughty Castle in October 2025.

On 2 December 2024 councillors agreed to defer their final decision, and gave the castle a stay-of-execution, with plans to revisit the decision no later than February 2025. Leisure and Culture Dundee committed to supporting the site's immediate future in partnership with the Broughty Ferry Trader Association, leaving open the possibility of continued community and heritage use.

Following further discussions between Historic Environment Scotland and Leisure and Culture Dundee, a February 2025 report proposed that the lease agreement for Broughty Castle remain in place.

In March 2026, a joint investment of £150,000 from Dundee City Council and the Northwood Charitable Trust was announced, securing the future of the castle for three years.

In July 2025, a community-led Save the Castle campaign was launched by Friends of Broughty Castle to oppose proposals that threatened to close the site. Around the same time, Leisure & Culture Dundee launched a fundraiser and secured a £50,000 funding package from Dundee City Council, which allowed the castle to remain open into late 2025, albeit with some reduced hours.

In September 2025, actor Brian Cox publicly voiced his support for the campaign, urging the council not to allow Broughty Castle to become a “mausoleum” and calling for a sustainable long-term future for the site.

In August 2026, Broughty Castle will host Dundee’s flagship viewing event for the August 2026 solar eclipse which is being organised by Mills Observatory. The castle’s position compared to the observatory is better favoured due to the position of the Sun.

== Gallery ==
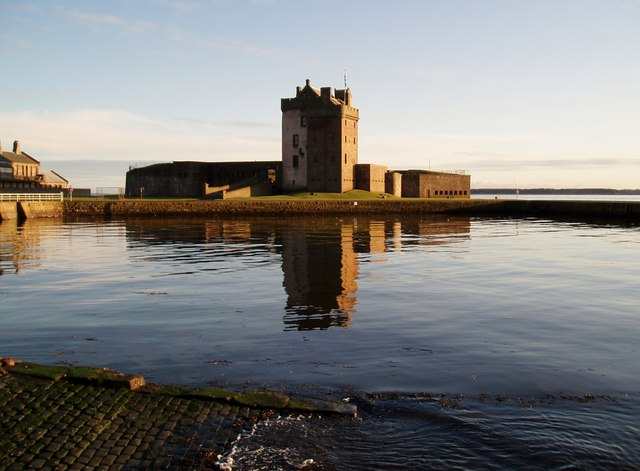
Broughty Castle

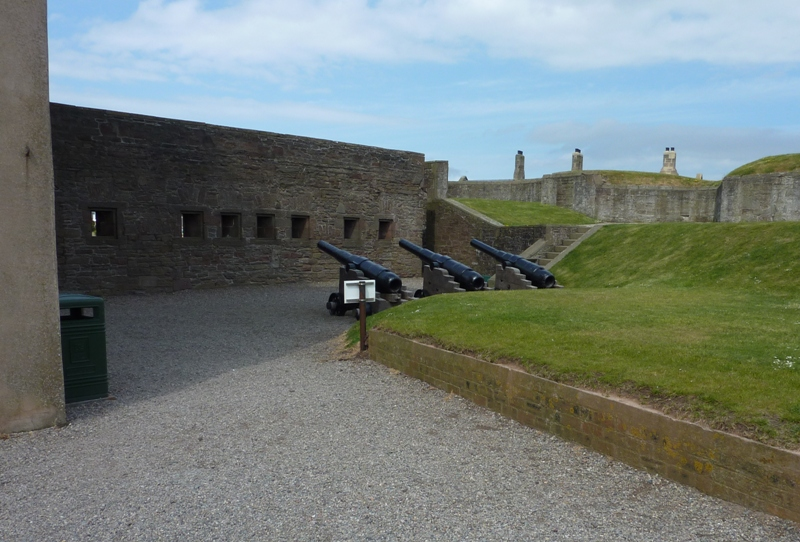
Broughty Castle Courtyard

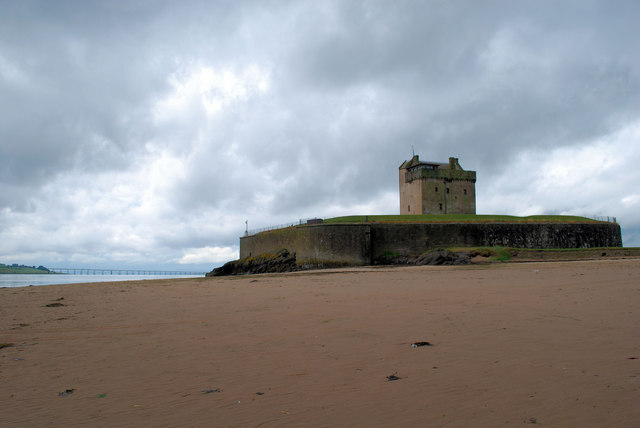
Broughty Ferry Beach with Broughty Castle

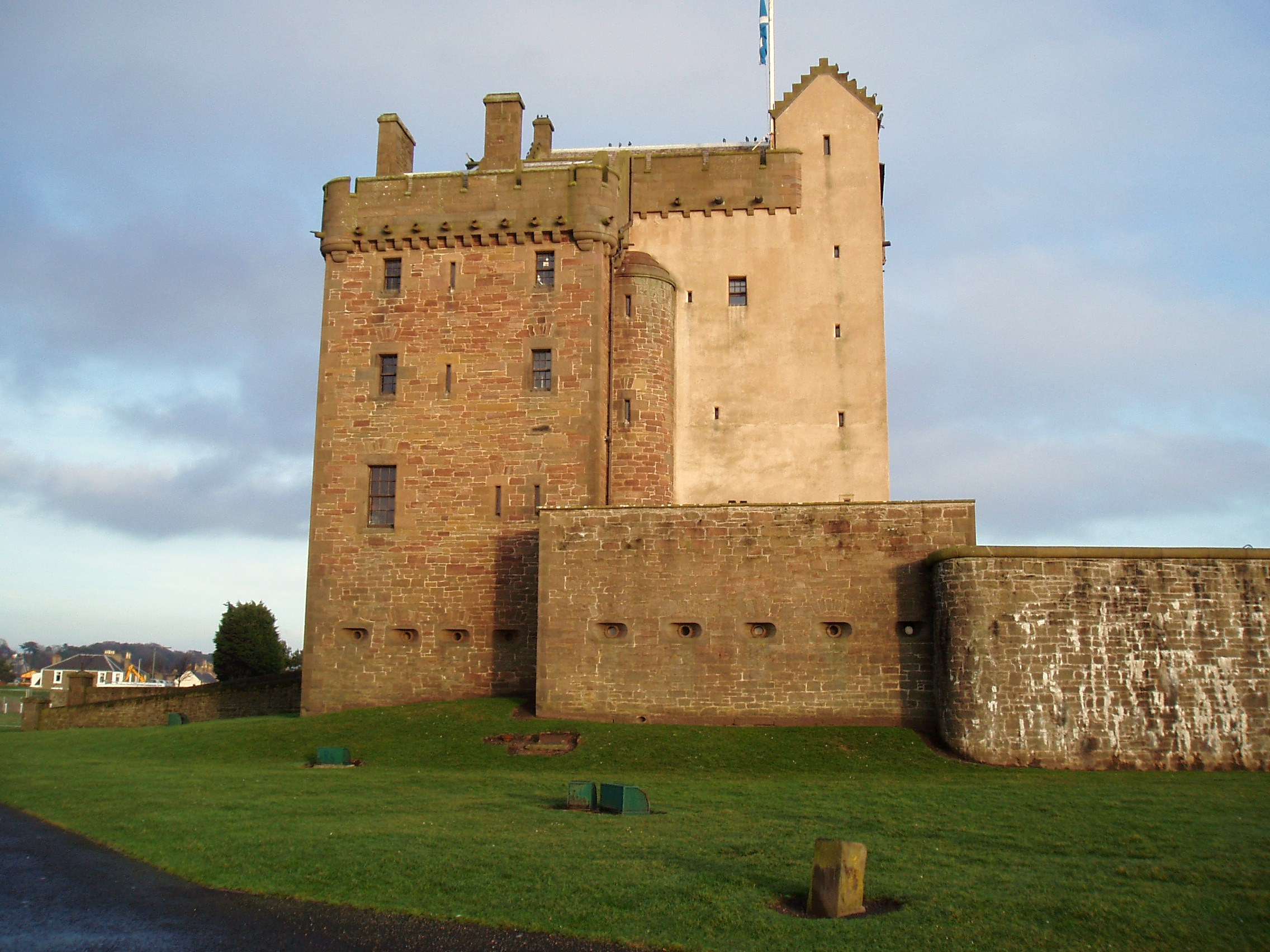
The Castle from a different view

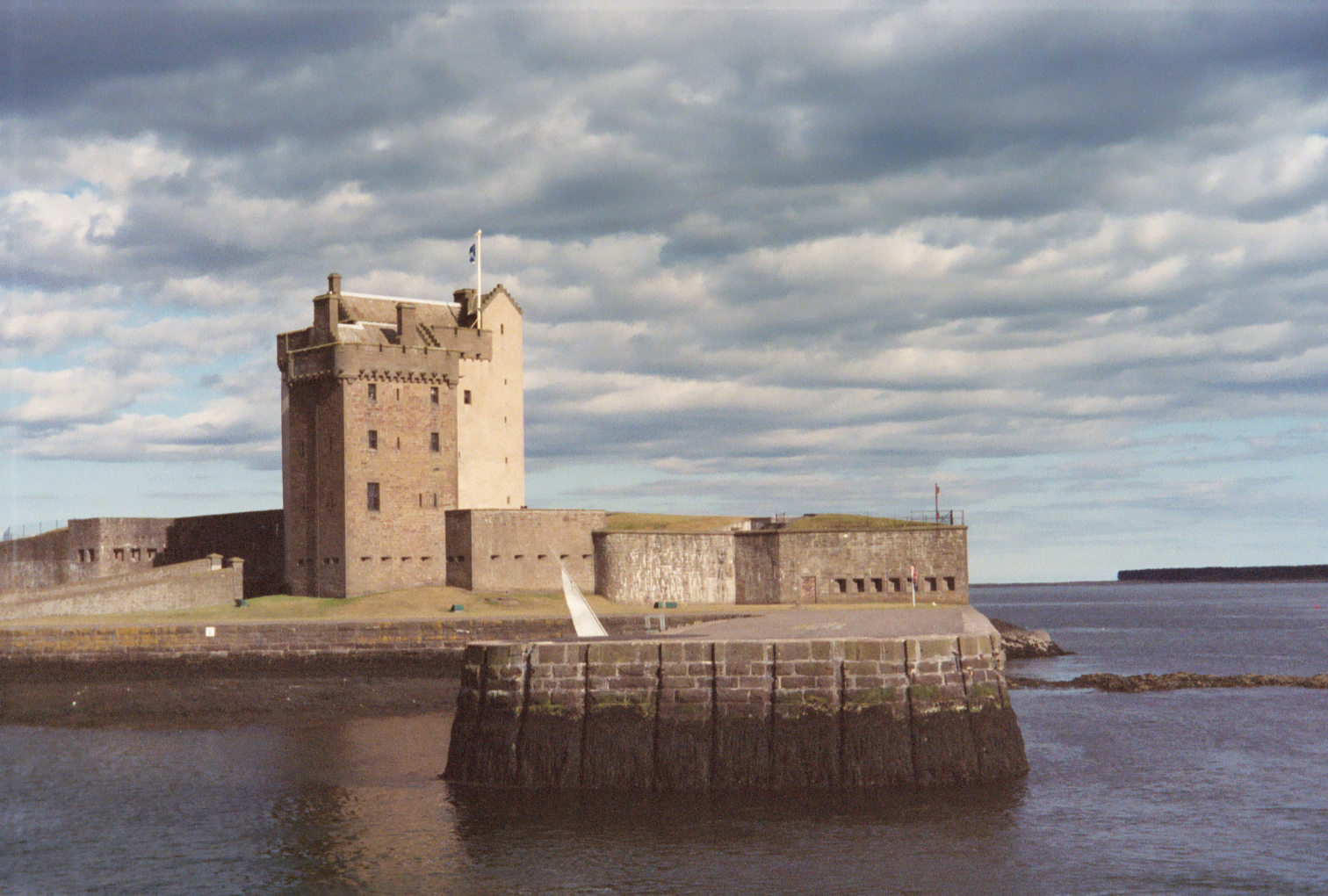
Broughty Castle on the banks of the River Tay

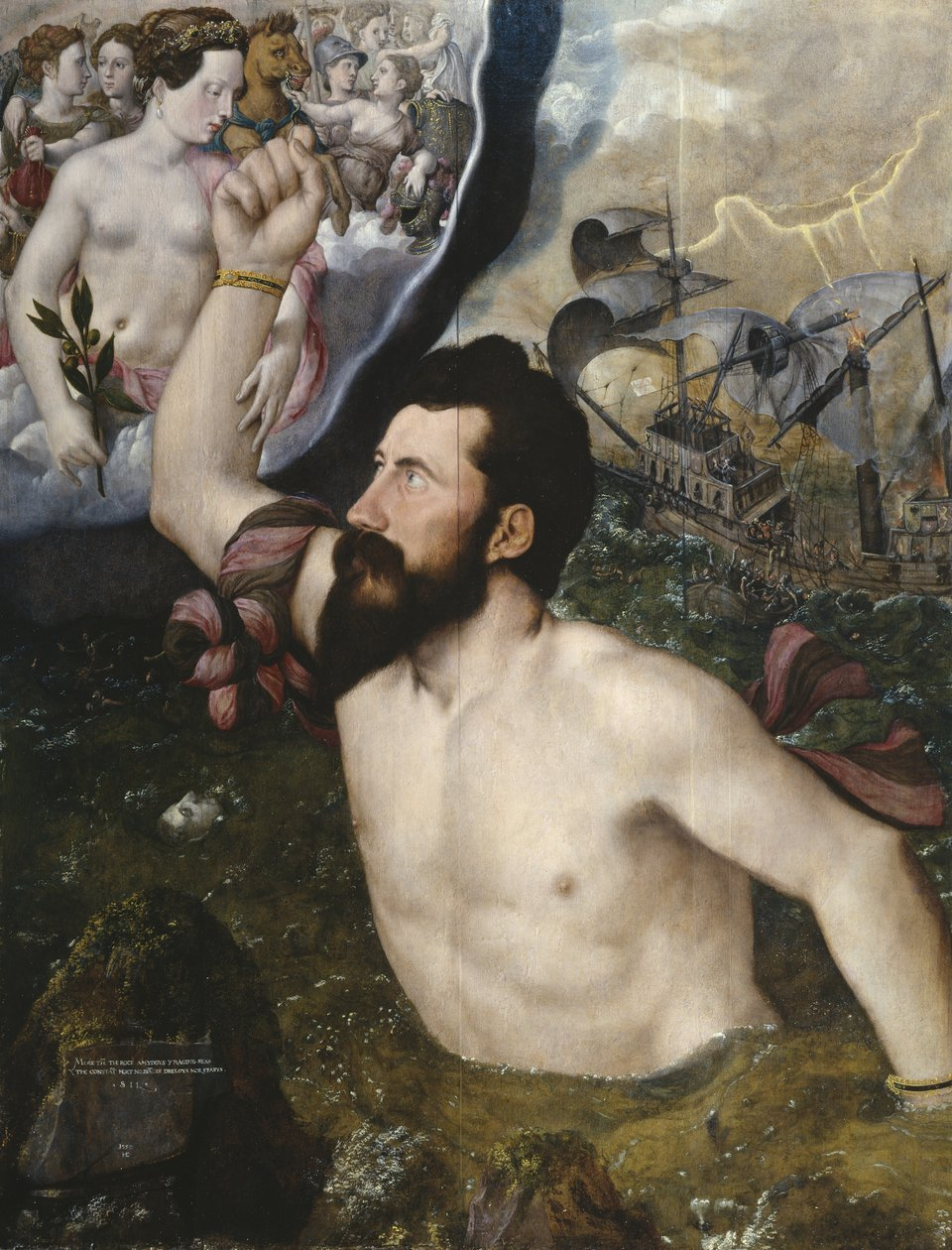
Portrait of John Luttrell by Hans Eworth, 1550
