= East Linton Bridge =

16th century bridge in East Lothian, Scotland

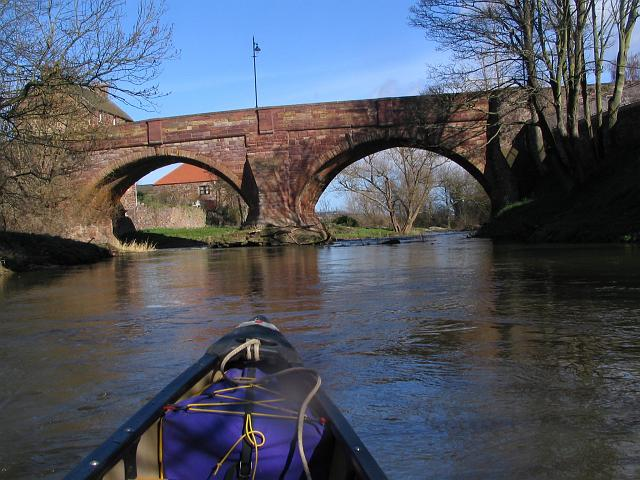
- Coordinates: 55.98523°N 2.65452°W
- Carries: B1377
- Crosses: River Tyne
- Locale: East Lothian
- Maintained by: East Lothian Council
- Preceded by: East Coast Mainline Rail Bridge
- Followed by: Tyneinghame Bridge

Characteristics
- Material: Masonry
- Total length: 30 metres (98 ft)
- Width: 5.7 metres (19 ft)
- Height: 9.6 metres (31 ft)

Listed Building – Category A
- Official name: Bridge End, Old Bridge
- Designated: 4 February 1971
- Reference no.: LB26632

Location
- Interactive map of East Linton Bridge

East Linton Bridge, also called Old Tyne Bridge, is a bridge over the River Tyne in the village of East Linton in the county of East Lothian, Scotland. In 1971, the bridge was designated a category A listed building.

== History ==
Before the bridge was constructed, a ford approximately 100m upstream served as the crossing of the Tyne at East Linton. On the site of the current bridge was an earlier structure. On 7 September 1547, English infantry under the command of the Duke of Somerset crossed the Tyne on this bridge.

On 8 July 1548, English and Spanish cavalry commanded by Pedro de Negro rode from Linton Bridge to relieve the siege of Haddington carrying gunpowder through French lines. Negro's exploit was described in a Spanish chronicle now known as the Chronicle of Henry VIII.

In September 1549 the bridge was destroyed by two quarry workers by the command of the Earl of Cassilis to delay the English retreat from the siege of Haddington.

On 31 March 1560, Lord Grey, with an English force wrote from "Linton-Briggs", saying "we are now at Linterne (sic) Brigges". Therefore, the current bridge was probably built circa 1560 at the latest. In 1617 Alexander Home, 1st Earl of Home escorted King James from Dunglass Castle to Pencraig by Linton Bridge.

Numerous repairs have been carried out, including in 1625, 1639, 1661, 1763 and 1934. In the course of the work in 1763, the bridge was probably widened. The Edinburgh to Berwick-upon-Tweed post road, later to become the A1, crossed the Tyne on this bridge until 1927 when a new bypass and bridge were constructed upstream. The old A1 road is now re-classified as the A199.

== Description ==
The 30m long and 5.7m wide masonry viaduct is located on the southern edge of the village. It spans the river with two segmental arches with spans of 12.2m. The masonry consists of roughly carved red and yellow sandstone, which was built into a layered masonry with bricked arches. The central pillar is equipped with a triangular protruding cutwater. The bridge has architectural parallels to the Abbey Bridge in Haddington. The delimiting balustrade was raised around 1895.

== See also ==
- List of bridges in Scotland
