= Thomas Gower (marshal of Berwick) =

Sir Thomas Gower (fl. 1543 – 1577) was an English soldier and Marshal of Berwick-upon-Tweed.

He was the son of Sir Edward Gower of Stittenham, Yorkshire, commissioner of the peace for that county in 1536. His mother was Margery, daughter of Sir Robert Constable of Flamborough. Thomas Gower was marshal of Berwick, and in 1543 was made the receiver-general and supervisor of all the buildings and fortifications of Berwick and of Wark Castle. Early in the reign of Edward VI, Gower was appointed surveyor of the royal estates in Northumberland and captain of Eyemouth, near Berwick (1 September 1547). In July he had reported to the Privy Council that the 'Power of Scotland' was prepared. He was captain of a band of light horsemen in the army with which the Lord Protector, the Duke of Somerset, invaded Scotland. At the Battle of Pinkie (10 September), Gower was one of three cavalry officers taken prisoners through 'their own too much forwardness' (Holinshed, p. 980).

Gower had to pay a considerable ransom, and 'as he was a poor man', was much burdened by expenses at Eyemouth, and had to appoint a deputy in his office as surveyor. For a time, he was a commander at Haddington while James Wilsford went to London. In 1549, he went to London to claim eighteen months' arrears of sums due for Eyemouth, and complained that other services had not been rewarded. Three years later (9 June 1552), £100 of his debt of £300 to the crown was remitted by the king through the Duke of Northumberland's influence. In November 1552, Christopher Rokeby was appointed marshal of Berwick in Gower's place.

In 1558 Gower is mentioned as master of the ordinance in the north parts. In 1559, he complained that one Bennett had been appointed over his head, and was apparently replaced, as he held the post in 1560, when he was made master of the ordinance in the army sent to besiege Leith. On his return, he continued to be employed in surveying defences. In 1569, the Earl of Sussex sent him to assist the mayor in the fortification of Newcastle. In 1577, he is last mentioned in a letter sent to the Council from the Earl of Huntingdon, enclosing a report from him on Kingston-upon-Hull, whither he had been sent to survey the castle and forts. He is spoken of as a "man well given in religion, and of good experience". By his first wife, Anne, daughter of James Mauleverer, Esq., he left a son and successor, Edward. See Wikipedia Thomas Gower 1st Baronet which states "son and heir of Sir Thomas Gower (military engineer and at one time Marshal of Berwick and later governor of Aymouth Fort)/Eyemouth, and his wife Mary, daughter of Gabriel Fairfax, Esq. of Steeton in Yorkshire." So what was the name of his son and successor Thomas or Edward. Most likely it is Thomas.

[State Papers, Domestic, Addenda, 1547–65 and 1566–79, Foreign Ser. 1558–59, 1559–60; Holinshed, pp. 978, 980; Stow's Annals, p. 641; Collins's Peerage, v. 140.]
