= Ralph Wulford =

Ralph Wulford (1479?–1499) (also Ralph Wilford), was a pretender of the Edward, Earl of Warwick.

== Life ==
He is described in Robert Fabyan's Chronicles as son of a cordwainer in London, and he was not improbably a member of the London and Kent family of Wilford [for example, see Sir James Wilford]. He resembles Lambert Simnel in the obscurity of his origin. And, like Simnel, he was one of the tools used by the Yorkists in their endeavours to overthrow Henry VII. Like Simnel, too, he was made to impersonate the Earl of Warwick, eldest son of Edward IV's brother, the Duke of Clarence, though, according to Fabyan, Wilford only ‘avaunced himself to be the son or heir to the Earl of Warwick's lands’ (Chronicle, p. 686) — an absurd statement as Warwick was not more than four years older than Wulford. Wulford was educated for the part by one Patrick, an Austin friar, and in 1498, rumours were spread abroad that that year was likely to be one of great danger for Henry VII (Cal. State Papers, Spanish, i. 206). Wulford began to confide to various persons in Kent — the scene of Warbeck's early attempts — that he was the real Earl of Warwick. Henry VII had, however, learned to be prompt in dealing with pretenders, and before the conspirators could take definite action both Wulford and his preceptor were arrested.

== Death ==
Wulford was executed on Shrove Tuesday, 12 February 1499. Patrick was imprisoned for life.
