= Wilsford =

Wilsford may refer to:

== Places ==
=== England ===
- Wilsford, Lincolnshire, village and civil parish
- Wilsford, Wiltshire, village and civil parish in the Vale of Pewsey
- Wilsford, village in Wilsford cum Lake parish, Wiltshire, near Amesbury

=== United States ===
- Wilsford (Lula, Georgia), listed on the NRHP in Georgia

== People with the surname ==
- James Wilsford (c.1516–1550), English soldier and politician
