= John Luttrell (painting) =

Oil painting by Hans Eworth

Sir John Luttrell
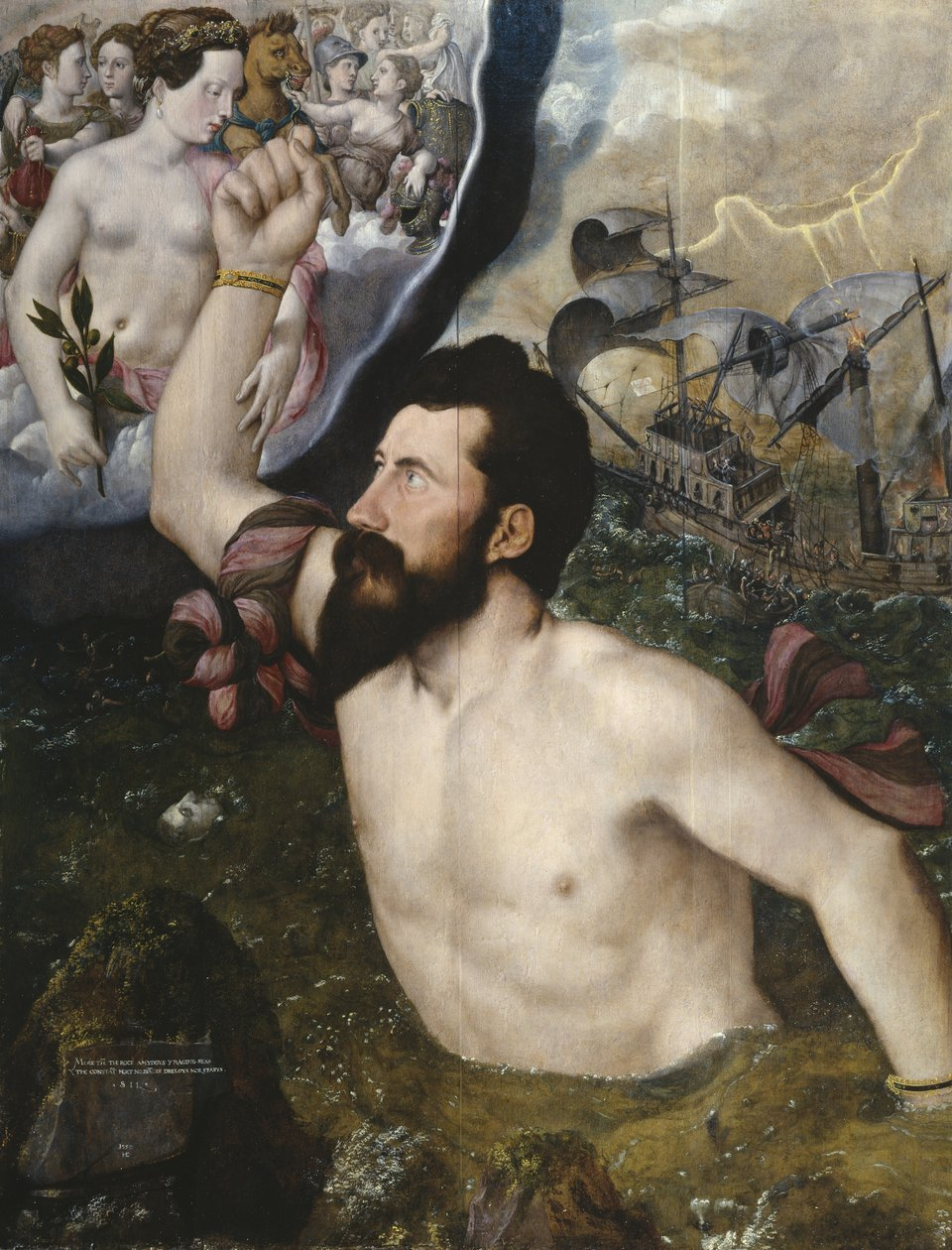
- Artist: Hans Eworth
- Year: 1550
- Type: Oil painting
- Location: London
- Owner: Courtauld Institute of Art

Sir John Luttrell is an allegorical portrait in oils by the London-based Flemish artist Hans Eworth painted in 1550, of Sir John Luttrell, an English soldier, diplomat, and courtier under Henry VIII and Edward VI.

== Details ==
The painting shows Sir John shaking his fist at a woman carrying an olive branch, while a ship founders on a stormy sea in the background. The painting is thought to represent Sir John's anger at the peace treaty of 1550 between England and France; the ship is probably the Mary of Hamburg, which he commanded during one of his Scottish campaigns. The art historian Oliver Garnett considers the painting to be "one of the most unusual and puzzling of all Tudor images".

The painting is now in the Courtauld Institute of Art in London; a copy, made in 1591, hangs at Dunster Castle in Somerset.

== Bibliography ==
- Garnett, Oliver. (2003) Dunster Castle, Somerset.London: The National Trust. ISBN 978-1-84359-049-1.
