= Katherine Palmer (abbess) =

16th-century abbess

Katherine Palmer (died 15 December 1576) was abbess of Syon Abbey during its peregrination in the Netherlands. She was responsible for preserving the only English religious community to continue unbroken through the Reformation.

== Life ==
Movement of the Syon nuns from Syon and back to England
The peregrination

Katherine was the younger daughter of Edward and Alice Palmer of Angmering, Sussex, and sister of John, Henry, and Thomas Palmer.

She was a nun in the Bridgettine order at Syon Abbey when it was suppressed in 1539 during the Dissolution of the Monasteries ordered by King Henry VIII as part of the Reformation. She was granted an annual pension of £6. In 1551, she and nine other members of her order travelled to Termonde, where she supervised an English convent on the grounds of Klooster Maria Troon.

During a short-lived return to England between 1566 and 1569, Palmer and twenty-four others were re-established at Syon Abbey by Cardinal Pole through a charter granted on 1 March 1557. Palmer was elected abbess on 31 July 1557 as the choice of Mary I. On the accession of Elizabeth I, the community was re-dissolved, and Palmer led them back to Maria Troon.

Palmer led the community between several locations in Zurich, Antwerp, and Mechelen in the face of Calvinist pressure, including a break-in by Calvinists a month before her death on 15 December 1576.

== Continuity of the order ==
On 8 May 1564, Palmer had Pope Pius IV recognise the continuity of her community from the initial foundation of Syon Abbey in 1415. This meant that Syon Abbey continued to exist as the same establishment through its subsequent peregrinations and retained access to all privileges that it had been granted since its foundation. The order did not return to England until 1861 and finally closed in 2011.
