= Christopher Rokeby =

English soldier and secret agent

Christopher Rokeby, Rokesby, Rooksby, or Rooksbie (died 1584) was an English soldier and secret agent.

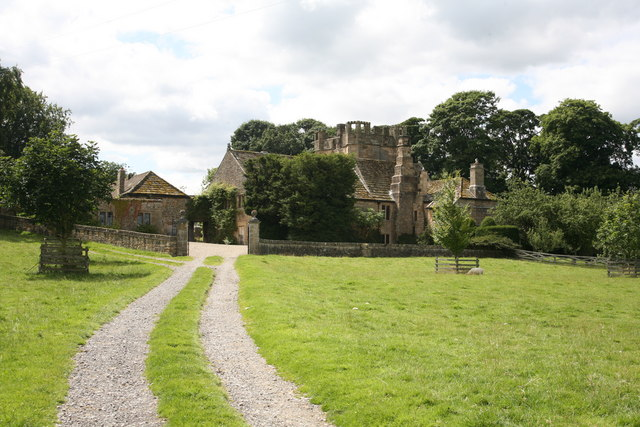
Mortham Tower, County Durham

== Family background ==
Rokeby's family home was Mortham Tower at Rokeby in County Durham. He was a son of Thomas Rokeby (died 1567) and his wife Jane, a daughter of Robert Constable of Cliffe. His younger brother was the lawyer and Master of Requests Ralph Rokeby. Christopher Rokeby married Margaret Lascelles, a daughter of Sir Roger Lascelles of Brackenburgh. His brother-in-law, Christopher Lascelles, was a Roman Catholic and a supporter of the right of Mary, Queen of Scots to the throne of England.

== Career ==
In November 1552 Edward VI appointed Christopher Rokeby as Marshal of Berwick as a replacement for Thomas Gower.

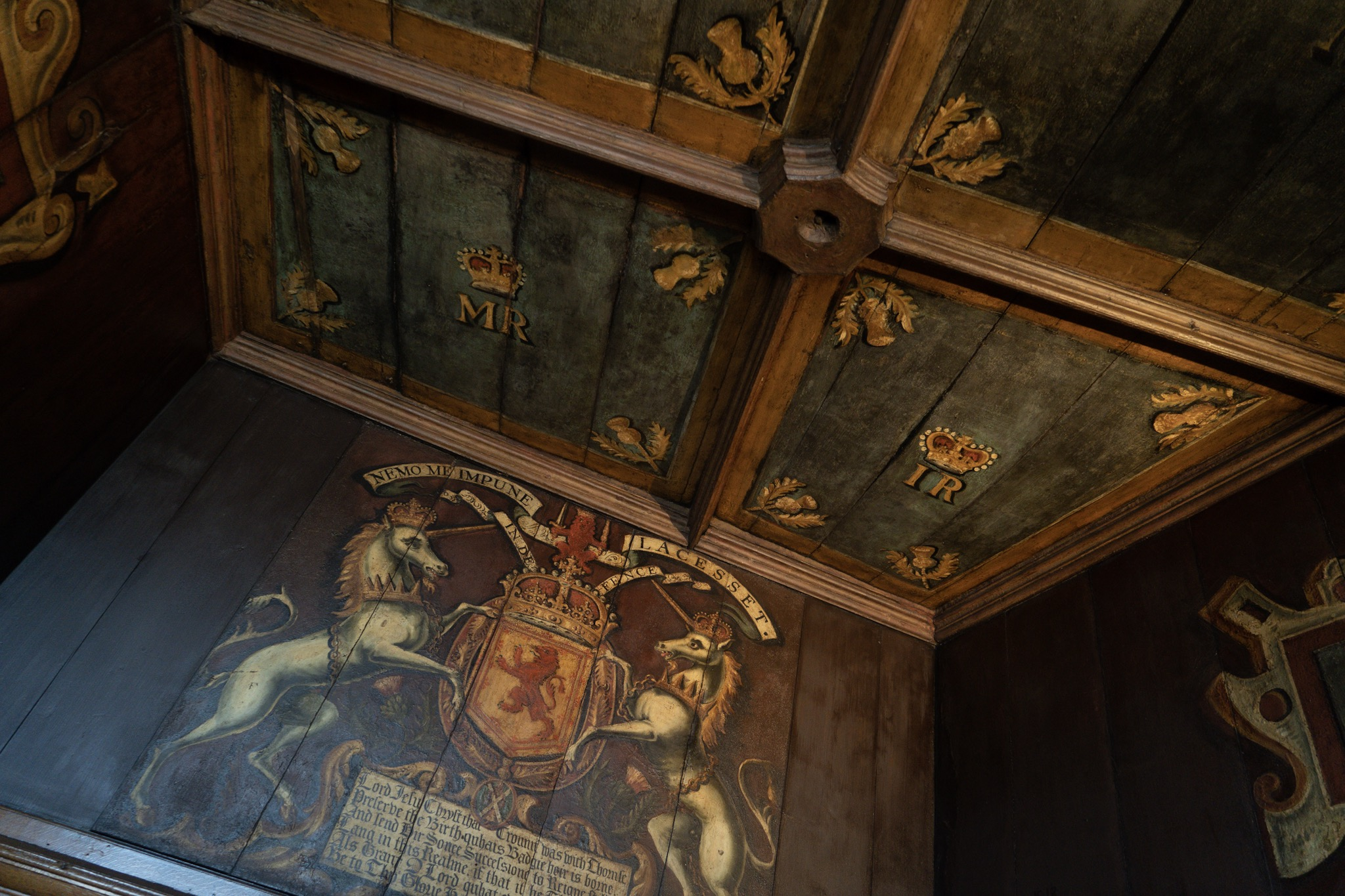
Christopher Rokeby met Mary, Queen of Scots in a closet at Edinburgh Castle.

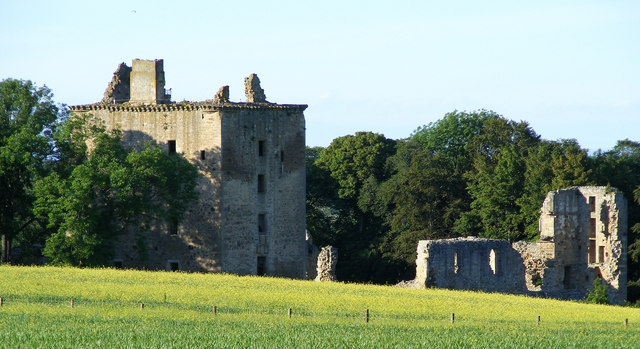
After he was rumbled, Rokeby was kept prisoner at Spynie Palace for 20 months.

In 1566 William Cecil sent Rokeby into Scotland to gain the confidence of Mary, Queen of Scots and Lord Darnley. On the way he visited Lascelles at Sowerby. His mission was to learn the names of Mary's friends in England. Rokeby tried to get employment in the service of Lord Darnley. Mary's secretary, Claude Nau, wrote that "Ruxby" gave Mary an ivory locket depicting the crucifixion.

On 2 July, Rokeby made contact with an English diplomat in Edinburgh, Henry Killigrew, who had been sent to congratulate Mary on the birth of her son. Killigrew complained about Rokeby's presence in Edinburgh. Sir Robert Melville, the Scottish ambassador in London, had guessed that Rokeby was an imposter and Cecil's agent. Rokeby's mission was revealed, and he was arrested by Captain Lauder on 3 July. His companions, Thomas Wright and John Turner, were released, but Rokeby was imprisoned at Spynie Palace for 20 months.

Wright returned to England and explained to officials at Berwick-upon-Tweed that he and Turner had spoken to Lord Darnley while he was riding between Leith and Edinburgh, and they knew the Standen brothers who served Darnley. Among Rokeby's papers were letters from Cecil, including, according to Claude Nau, a gift of £100 yearly.

Mary wrote to William Cecil in October. The "strange dealinges of ane Inglisman namyt Rewkisby" had shaken her good opinion of him. However, her trust was restored by the reports of Sir Robert Melville and she invited Cecil to attend and assist at the baptism of her son. Cecil did not attend.

After his release, Rokeby wrote to Cecil describing his meetings with Mary, Queen of Scots in Edinburgh Castle in May 1566. On his second day in Edinburgh, Mary, who was heavily pregnant, invited him to come at night to Edinburgh Castle. She met him in a "little closet", perhaps the room where James VI was born. Mary asked him for news about the court in London. She entrusted him to the care of James Melville. The next night Rokeby was brought to the closet again. Mary sat on a little coffer without a cushion, and Rokeby knelt beside her. She talked of her hopes for the English succession and her Catholic allies in the northern counties of England. She recommended that he speak with her close confidante, the Earl of Bothwell.

Rokeby's father died while he was still a prisoner at Spynie. According to his younger brother Anthony Rokeby, after the murder of Lord Darnley, his captors coerced him to agree to assassinate Bothwell. In July 1567, when Mary was captive at Lochleven, the English diplomat Nicholas Throckmorton advised Anthony Rokeby to go to Stirling Castle and discuss the matter with William Maitland of Lethington and the associated lords. Throckmorton felt that Elizabeth I would not condone such a plan, especially as the wider conspiracy involved the murder of the elderly Patrick Hepburn, Bishop of Moray.

Rokeby is said to have led troops against the rebels during the Rising of the North. Christopher Neville, an uncle of Charles Neville, 6th Earl of Westmorland, tried to attack and kill Rokeby at a horse race, but he was defended by family followers who rallied to the cry "A Rokeby, A Rokeby".

A family history records that Christopher Rokeby received a pension of £100 from Queen Elizabeth for his services in Scotland, and that his servant John Turner was nearly hanged, although the author did not know what service he had done.
