= Siege of Haddington =

1548–49 Siege of Haddington during the War of the Rough Wooing

Coordinates: 55.955°N 2.782°W

Sieges of Haddington
- Part of Anglo-Scottish Wars; Rough Wooing
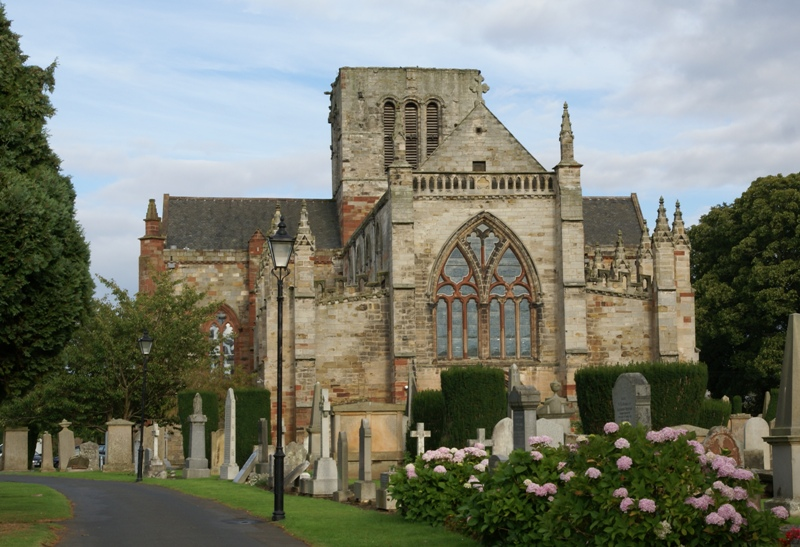
- The restored Church of St. Mary the Virgin, heavily damaged during the sieges
Date	July 1548 – 19 September 1549
Location	Haddington, Scotland
Result	Franco-Scottish victory

Belligerents
Kingdom of Scotland; Kingdom of France	Kingdom of England

Commanders and leaders
Earl of Arran; Lord Methven; Paul de Thermes; André de Montalembert; Henri Cleutin	Earl of Shrewsbury; Baron Grey of Wilton; Sir James Wilford; Sir Thomas Palmer; Thomas Gower

Strength
~ 5,000–6,000	~ 15,000

Casualties and losses
Unknown	~ 14,000 dead, mostly from disease

The sieges of Haddington were a series of sieges staged at the Royal Burgh of Haddington, East Lothian, Scotland, as part of the War of the Rough Wooing, one of the last Anglo-Scottish Wars. Following Regent Arran's defeat at the battle of Pinkie Cleugh on Saturday 10 September 1547, he captured the town of Haddington. The intention was to form a network of mutually supporting English forts in lowland Scotland. The English forces built artillery fortifications and were able to withstand an assault by the besieging French and Scots troops supported by heavy cannon in July 1548. Although the siege was scaled down after this unsuccessful attempt, the English garrison abandoned the town on 19 September 1549, after attrition by Scottish raids at night, sickness, and changing political circumstance.

== The English dig in ==
The English commander, Grey of Wilton, captured and garrisoned Haddington and outlying villages by 23 February 1548. The garrison included 200 Albanian Stratioti who had previously fought in the French army. At the end of February 1548, Regent Arran brought four cannon to besiege and take the East Lothian houses of Ormiston, Brunstane, and Saltoun which John Cockburn of Ormiston and Alexander Crichton of Brunstane held for England, and summoned the men of Stirling, Menteith, and Strathearn to the field.

Grey and Thomas Palmer began to fortify the town in earnest after 24 April 1548. Wilton described how he viewed the town with Palmer, envisaging a fortification that would enclose all the "fair houses" of the town. He had cleared the ground and was entrenched against the enemy. Regent Arran brought 5,000 men to Musselburgh at the end of the month. An inventory of food stored in Haddington at this time includes "oxen alive", bacon, cereal and peas, claret wine, sack, and Malmsey.

The English strategy was for the siege of Haddington to consume Scottish and French resources. The soldiers built the fortifications alongside labourers from England who were called 'pioneers.' Timber was brought from the woods of Broun of Colstoun. Although the site had obvious drawbacks, overlooked by the ridge of the nearby Garleton Hills and four miles from the sea, the finished ramparts were much admired.

Local landowners unwilling to collaborate had to relocate. George Seton, 6th Lord Seton and his French wife Marie Pieris moved from their home at Seton Palace to Culross Abbey.

The French ambassador in London, Odet de Selve, heard from a French mercenary serving on the English side that it was almost as impregnable as Turin. Somerset even showed Odet de Selve the plan, a large rectangle by the river Tyne, and said it was larger than the fortified area of Calais, and would hold 4,000 troops. Selve sent a spy to Scotland for details, who reported the walls were as yet only the earth excavated from the ditches, but stone from demolished houses would be used.

The design include four corner bastions, called Bowes, Wyndham, Taylor, and Tiberio, after the commanders. Francisco Tiberio was the leader of a company of Italian mercenaries. The French ambassador was told that the tollbooth, a tall and solid stone structure, had been filled with earth to form a gun platform called a cavalier. English pioneers digging the town ditch found curious ancient coins on 7 June which Grey of Wilton sent to Somerset for their strangeness.

=== Pedro de Negro and a Spanish force attempt to join the garrison at Haddington ===
Grey of Wilton hoped to trick the French by letting a false message about reinforcements fall into their hands. He thought this would make them reluctant to attack and win him time. He sent 100 Spanish soldiers with their commander Pedro de Negro to join the garrison at the end of June 1548, but they encountered the enemy and rode to safety at Berwick.

== Sieges ==
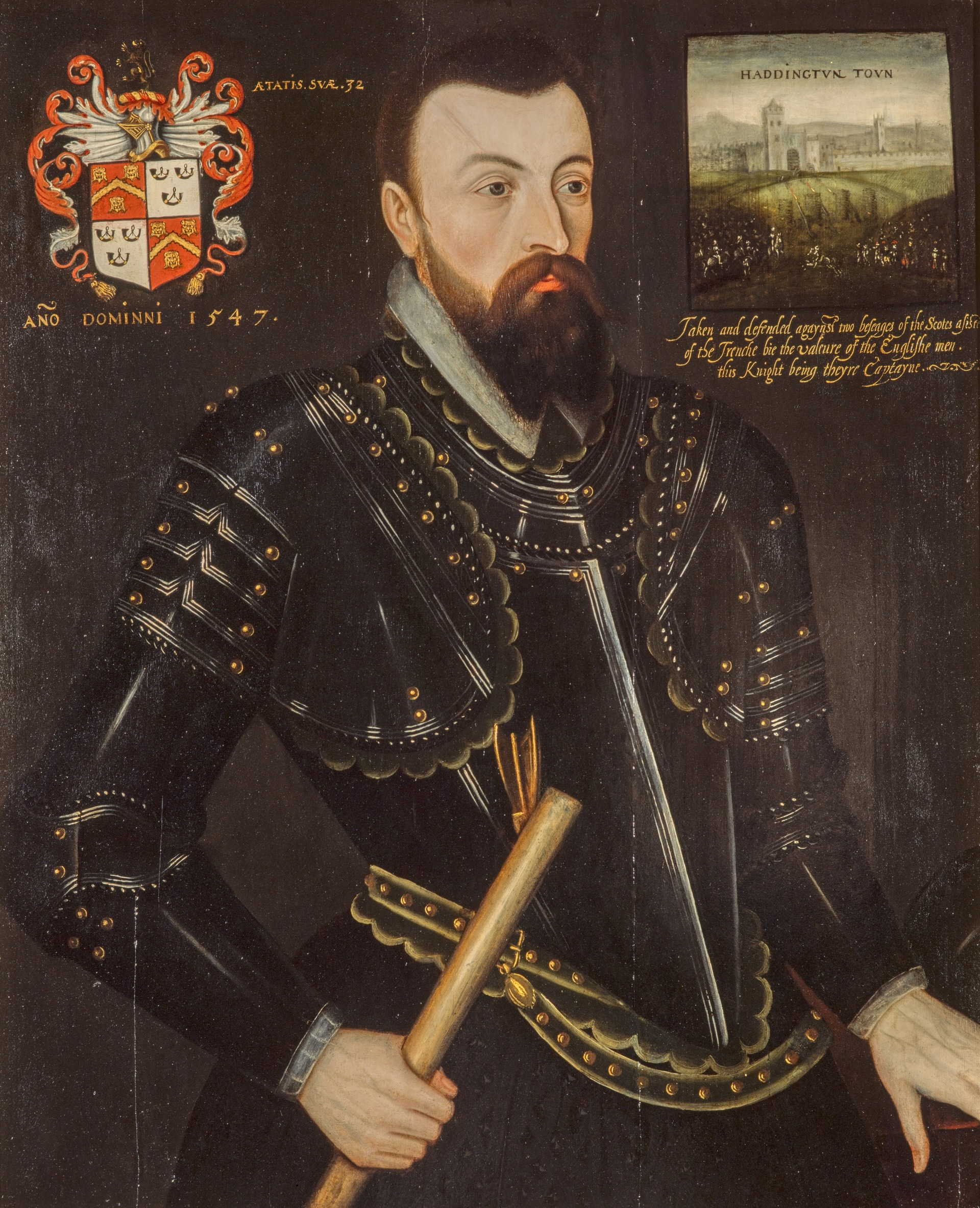
Sir James Wilsford

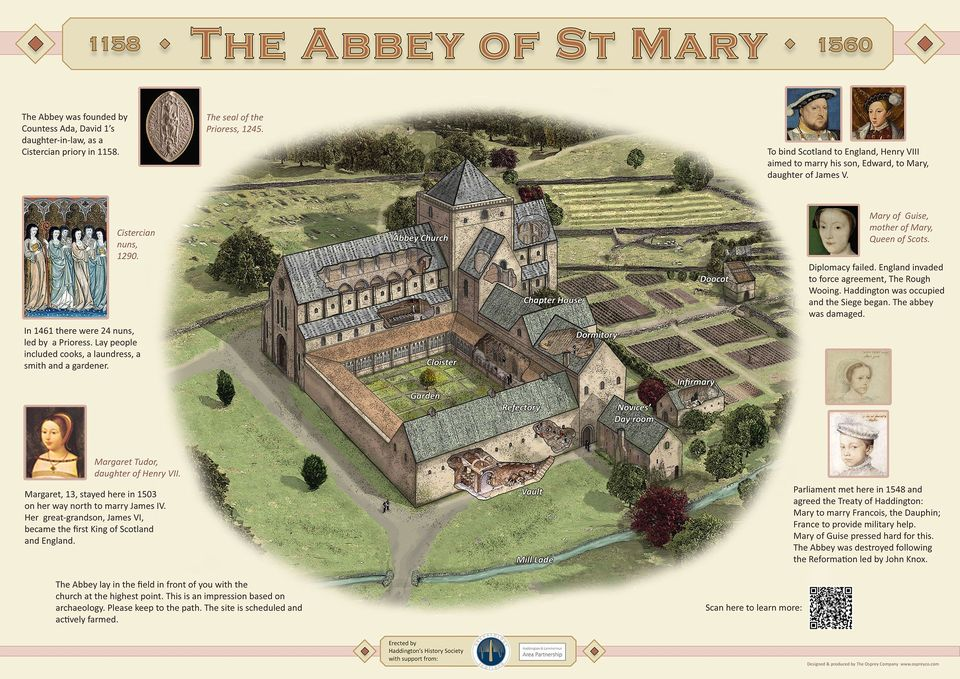
Information panel at the site of the Abbey of St Mary Haddington, the Scottish siege headquarters

Haddington's garrison of occupation was commanded by Sir James Wilford. The Master of the Scottish Artillery, Lord Methven, organised guns to be brought from the siege of Broughty Castle in June. These guns were shipped to Aberlady, the nearest haven on the Forth. The great Scottish gun 'thrawinmouth' from Dunbar Castle was also deployed and the cannons from Broughty were placed on 3 July 1548. On 5 July Methven gave Mary of Guise an optimistic report of the damage caused to the English defences by his guns. His fire had demolished the Tollbooth within the town, and he had advanced trenches towards the ramparts.

English chronicles report the efforts of the English commander, James Wilsford, who every night repaired the damage caused by the artillery in the day, despite the large number of casualties. When Wilsford made a trip to London, Thomas Gower served in his place.

=== July 1548 ===
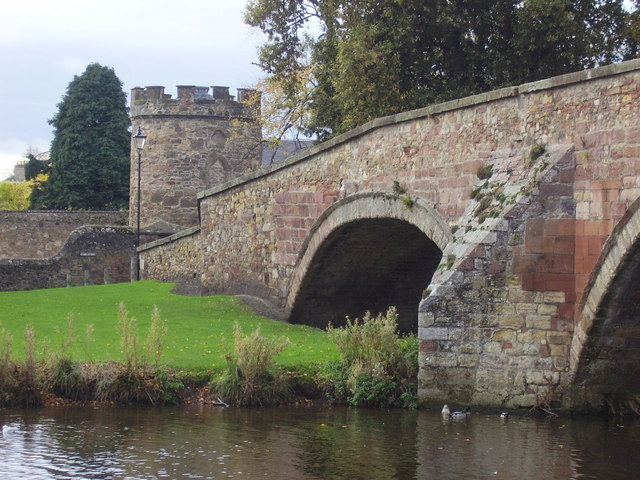
Nungate bridge: Haddington is bounded by the River Tyne to the south and west

The first Scottish effort to raise an army to expel the English from Haddington had limited success. On 20 July 1548, a justiciary court held at St Mary's Abbey ordered Archibald Hamilton of Raploch and the bailies of Lesmahagow to punish tenants in that barony for not joining the force besieging the town.

French and Scottish troops began to seriously besiege the town in July 1548. Jean de Beaugué described Highland soldiers, followers of the Earl of Argyll, who wore dyed shirts "and a certain light covering made of wool of various colours", considered an early reference to tartan plaids. On 5 July 1548 Mary of Guise held a council at nearby Elvingston or "Herdmandston", and the next day went to Clerkington, where the French and Italians were making a fortified camp and had demolished a bridge over the River Tyne. The French troops prepared ladders for an assault on the town. The English army outside the town made plans to get supplies to the defenders.

An English soldier Thomas Holcroft reported that on 8 July, Pedro de Gamboa's mounted arquebusiers, commanded by another Spanish captain, Pedro de Negro, and other soldiers rode through French lines from Linton bridge to relieve the siege. Negro's exploit was described in a Spanish chronicle now known as the Chronicle of Henry VIII. The chronicle relates that the Spanish and English cavalrymen rode into Haddington carrying bags of gunpowder. Rather than return to Linton through enemy lines, they slaughtered their own horses outside the town gates, and after the French and Scottish had withdrawn, Pedro de Negro buried them in three pits. Odet de Selve wrote that Somerset told him about the exploit of 400 arquebusiers who carried powder into the town to relieve the shortage.

Mary of Guise came to view the siege on 9 July and swooned in a faint when a cannon shot landed near her and injured some of her companions. On the other side of the country, Mary, Queen of Scots embarked with Nicolas Durand de Villegaignon at Dumbarton Castle for France.

Thomas Palmer and Holcroft discovered that German gunners working with the Scots were building a platform for artillery in the church tower. At this time the English inside Haddington were countermining against the French and Scottish siegeworks. A Scots force joined the French troops on 16 July to storm the town but were driven away by cannon fire. Following this set-back, the French officer André de Montalembert, Sieur d'Essé ordered the heavy guns to be withdrawn on 17 July. With rumours of English reinforcement, Methven took the Scottish and French guns to Edinburgh and Leith, while d'Essé kept the camp. D'Essé made his feelings known to Arran; that an earlier decisive assault before the English had time to entrench would have been the best action. The English military engineer, Thomas Pettit, Surveyor of Calais, was captured and taken to Edinburgh to be held for ransom by d'Essé.

=== Tuesday's Chase ===
An English cavalry defeat at Haddington on 17 July 1548 became known in Scotland as "Tuesday's Chase". It was claimed that 800 English soldiers were killed and 2,000 taken prisoner. English prisoners taken at Tuesday's Chase included Nicholas Gaynesford, who had served as a lieutenant of Lord Grey's own men at arms at Pinkie. Gaynesford was captured by Andrew Ker of Littledean (died 1573). Gaynesford was released in August 1549 on payment of a ransom of £800 Scots or 400 old rose nobles.

=== August 1548 ===
In August 1548 the Scots and French made a base at Clerkington, defended by ditches 14 feet across. Shrewsbury arrived on 23 August with an army close in size to the English army at Pinkie. He camped for a few days at Spittal Hill near Aberlady. The French and Scots abandoned their siege of Haddington and retired to Edinburgh and Leith. Edward VI was told that some of the departing besiegers had spoken to Captain Tiberio. They had pointed out the inadequacies of the fortifications and said all honour was due to the defenders and none to themselves. Edward also recorded a subsequent large but unsuccessful night raid against Haddington.

=== October and November 1548 ===
The French troops in Edinburgh started a fight in Edinburgh in October 1548 over a culverin sent for repair and several Scots were killed on the Royal Mile. D'Essé organised a night raid on Haddington to increase their popularity among their potential Scottish supporters. The raid was repulsed after the English watch shouted, "Bows and Bills", which according to John Knox was the usual alarm of the time. While the French were away from Edinburgh the townsfolk killed some of their wounded. On 1 November 1548, Wilford wrote to Somerset describing the state of Haddington, with a garrison stricken by plague:

"The state of this town pities me both to see and to write it; but I hope for relief. Many are sick and a great number dead, most of the plague. On my faith there are not here this day of horse, foot, and Italians, 1000 able to go to the walls, and more like to be sick, than the sick to mend, who watch the walls every 5th night, yet the walls are un-manned."

== English withdraw ==
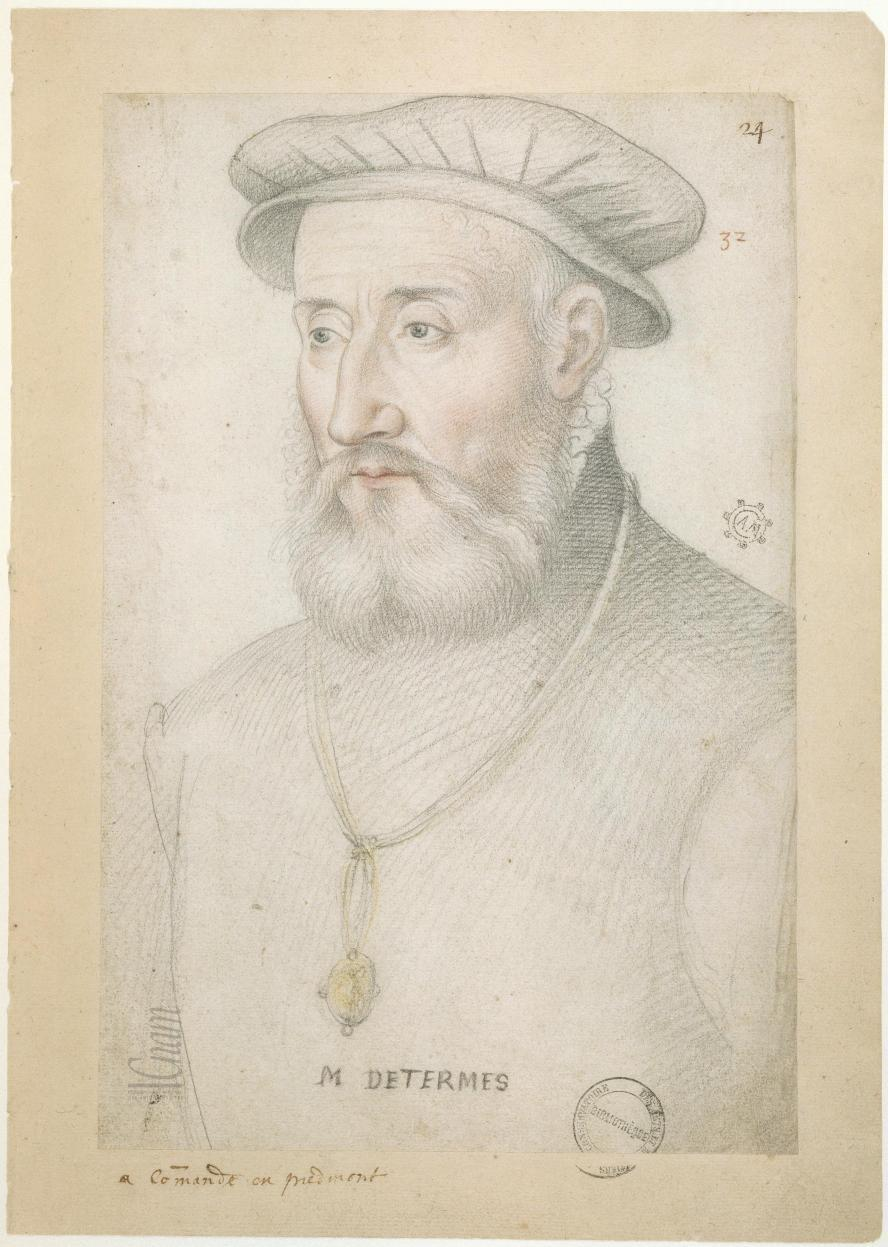
Maréchal Paul de Thermes, after François Clouet, 1554.

The English withdrew because they were out of supplies, many of their men had died from disease or during the Scottish night raids, and more French re-inforcements had arrived under Paul de Thermes. The English (and their mercenary forces, which included German and Spanish professional soldiers) evacuated Haddington on 19 September 1549, travelling overland to Berwick upon Tweed. Mary of Guise was triumphant.

== Ulpian Fulwell ==
The English writer Ulpian Fulwell included some stories that he heard from Haddington veterans including Captain Dethick in his Flower of Fame. He describes a siege at Yester Castle which was garrisoned by a Scottish and Spanish force. When they surrendered they were all pardoned, except a soldier who had cursed the English leaders from the battlements. It was unclear if this man was one Newton, or a man called Hamilton, and Lord Grey of Wilton made these suspects fight a duel in the market place of Haddington. Newton won the duel, killing Hamilton, and was freed, even though the English soldiers recognised his voice. Fulwell describes various events of the siege of Haddington, and says that the cannon that nearly injured Mary of Guise at the nunnery was called "roaring meg". Fulwell composed a verse naming the English captains.

== Sources ==
- Fullwell, Ulpian, The Flower of Fame, with a discourse of the worthie service that was done at Haddington in Scotlande the second yere of the raigne of King Edward the Sixe, William Hoskins, London (1575), 49r-59r.
- Merriman, Marcus H., The History of the King's Works, vol. 4 (1982), ed. H. M. Colvin, part iv, 'The Scottish Border', 607–726.
- Merriman, Marcus H., The Rough Wooings, Tuckwell (2000)
- Phillips, Gervase, The Anglo-Scots Wars, Woodbridge (1999)
- Phillips, Gervase, 'In the Shadow of Flodden', Scottish military tactics, 1513–1550, Scottish Historical Review, 77 (1998), 162–182.
