= John Luttrell (soldier) =

English soldier, diplomat and courtier

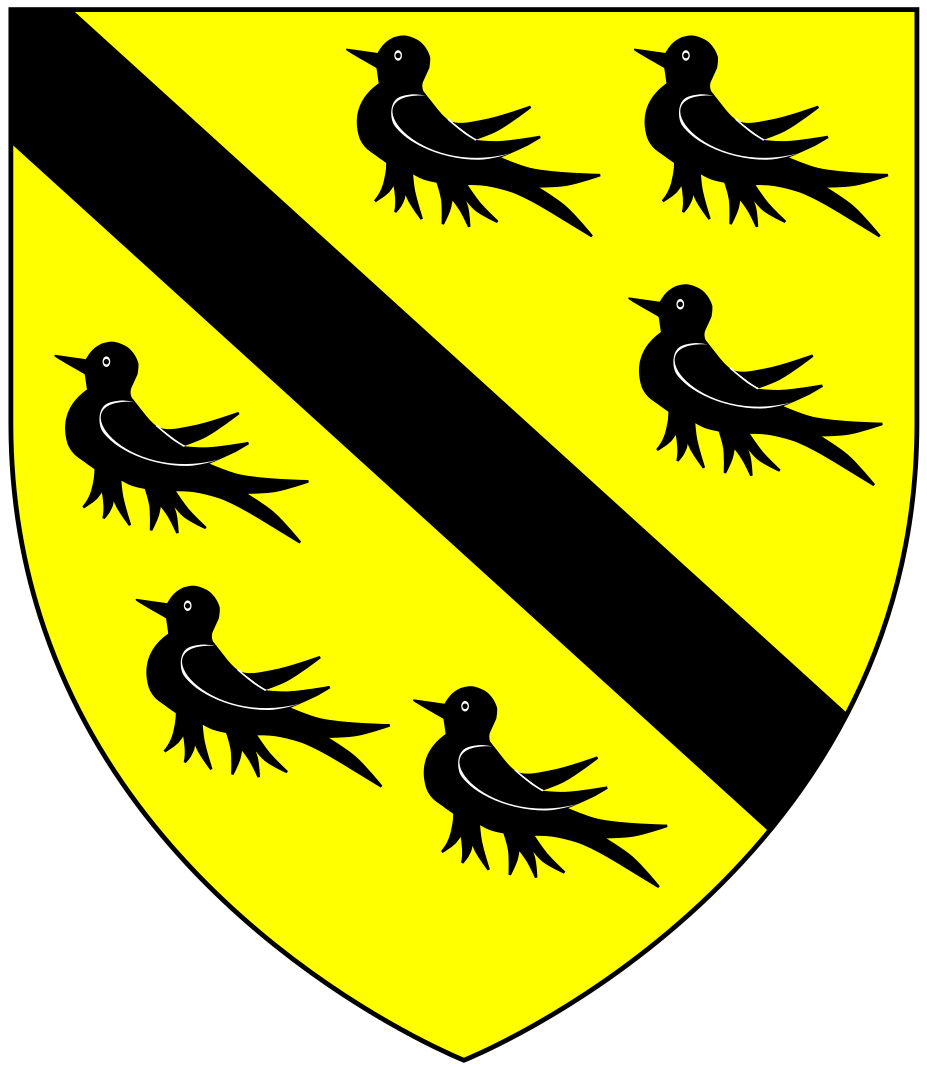
Arms of Luttrell: Or, a bend between six martlets sable

Sir John Luttrell (c. 1518/19 – 10 July 1551) feudal baron of Dunster in Somerset, of Dunster Castle, was an English soldier, diplomat, and courtier under Henry VIII and Edward VI. He served under Edward Seymour, Earl of Hertford (later Duke of Somerset and Lord Protector) in Scotland and France. His service is commemorated in an allegorical portrait by Hans Eworth.

== Life and military career ==
John Luttrell was the eldest son of Sir Andrew Luttrell of Dunster Castle, Somerset by his wife, Margaret, daughter of Sir Thomas Wyndham. He married Mary, daughter of Sir Griffith Ryce and Katherine Edgcumbe, by whom he had three daughters, Catherine, Dorothy, and Mary. John Luttrell, his younger brother, and his uncle Thomas Wyndham served as boy pages in the household of Cardinal Wolsey during his embassy to France in July 1527.

Luttrell accompanied Edward Seymour, Earl of Hertford in the first stages of the military expeditions to Scotland known as the Rough Wooing and was present at the taking of Edinburgh and Leith. He was knighted at Leith by Hertford on 11 May 1544, immediately following the capture and burning of Edinburgh.

In 1546, as the border wars in Scotland dragged on, Luttrell accompanied Hertford to France where the earl had been appointed commander of the English forces at the captured port of Boulogne. Luttrell commanded a force of 100 men during five months of "fast moving raids, vicious skirmishes, and ambushes" between Hertford's army and the French.

After the death of Henry VIII on 28 January 1547, Hertford, elevated to Duke of Somerset and Lord Protector to his nephew Edward VI, pursued Henry's goal of forcibly allying Scotland to England by marrying Edward to the young Mary, Queen of Scots, a conflict now known as the Rough Wooing. In September 1547, Luttrell accompanied Somerset's army into Scotland, and led the vanguard of 300 men at the Battle of Pinkie, where the Scots were resoundingly defeated.

In the aftermath of Pinkie, Luttrell was appointed captain of the English base at the island Abbey of Inchcolm in the Firth of Forth, from whence he harassed Scottish shipping with little success. His uncle Thomas Wyndham visited in December with two warships. on 28 December 1547 he raided Burntisland and burnt ships and buildings at the pier, and Rossend Castle surrendered to him. Eventually Inchcolm was abandoned, and Luttrell was sent north in March 1548 to captain Broughty Castle which dominated the Tay and Dundee. In August 1548 Luttrell was troubled by rumours that he had mismanaged royal funds, and he declared "though I be not so rich as others are, nor have not so profitable and easy entertainments (employment), yet I trust it shall not appear I esteem any of the King's Majesty's money above the duty of a humble true subject". One of Luttrell's brothers was killed in Dundee in November 1548.

Early in 1549 he was joined at Broughty by Pedro de Negro and his band of Spanish soldiers. Luttrell was trusted as a diplomatist no less than as a soldier, and, in March 1549, he was appointed one of the two English commissioners to treat with the Earls of Argyll, Athol and Errol and others, with a view to the expulsion of the French (who were allied with the Scots against the English) from Scotland, and a marriage between Edward and Mary. The negotiation, however, came to nothing. Some of Luttrell's correspondence at this time was captured by the French, and still survives, but perhaps the most remarkable survival is his 'letter of defiance' written to James Doig of Dunrobin besieging him at Broughty Castle in November 1548. The tide was already turning in Scotland's favour, and at midnight on 12 February 1550 Luttrell and the garrison at Broughty surrendered to a joint French and Scottish force.

Luttrell was held for ransom as a prisoner of James Doig of Dunrobin. On the day the peace of the Treaty of Boulogne was declared in England, 29 March 1550, Thomas Wyndham was sent to Scotland with two post horses and five Scottish hostages to exchange for Luttrell. On 16 May 1550 Archbishop Hamilton organised the payment of his ransom of £1000 for the exchange of the sons of George Douglas of Pittendreich and the Master of Semple. George Douglas's son would later rule Scotland as Regent Morton. Luttrell was immediately arrested for a debt to a Dundee merchant. Regent Arran paid this £19-11s in September 1550. Back in England, he was rewarded with a gift of land in July 1550 by John Dudley, Earl of Warwick, who had seized control of the Council from Somerset in 1549.

Sir John Luttrell died in an epidemic of the sweating sickness on 10 July 1551, while preparing for an expedition to Morocco with his uncle, Thomas Wyndham. His three daughters were co-heiresses to one third part of his estates, the other two-thirds devolving, by two entails and Sir John's will, upon his next brother, Thomas Luttrell.

== Portrait ==
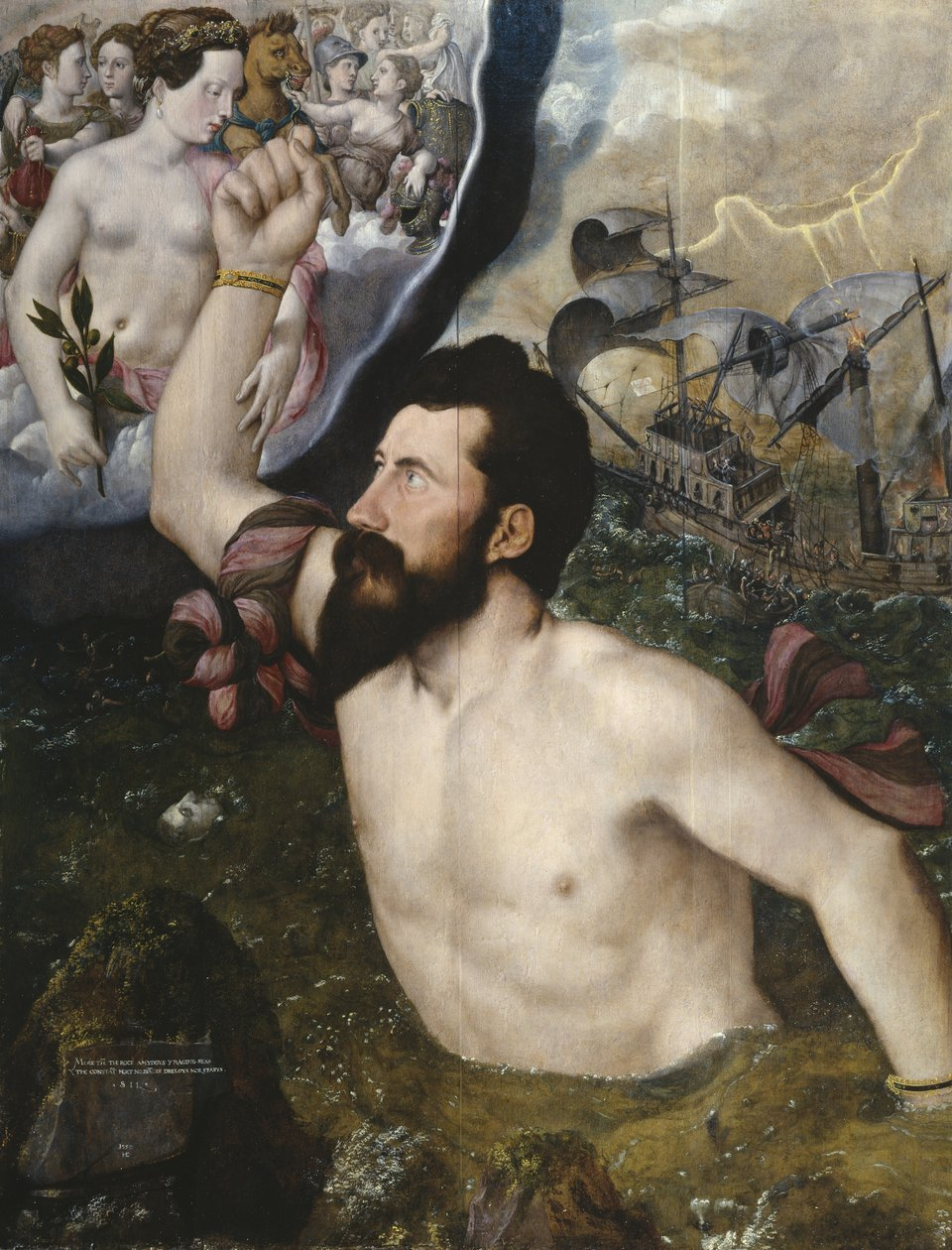
Allegorical portrait of Sir John Luttrell by Hans Eworth, 1550

An allegorical portrait of John Luttrell with the goddesses Pax, Venus, Minerva, and the Three Graces by Hans Eworth is thought to commemorate Luttrell's service with English armed forces and the subsequent Treaty of Boulogne of 24 March 1550 which formally ended England's long war with Scotland and France. John remained a prisoner in Scotland after the treaty until his debts and ransom were paid in September 1550. His brother Captain Hugh Luttrell had fought at Boulogne, but he deserted and was thought to have tried to betray the town to the French.

The painting's complex allusions to Luttrell's military service and to the role of sea power in the war with Scotland and France were expounded by Dame Frances Yates in 1967. The inscription on the rock in the foreground reads;

More than the Rock Amydys the Raging Seas,
The Constant Hert no Danger Dreddys nor Fearys
S. I. L. (Sir John Luttrell), 1550 HE (Hans Eworth)"

His right bracelet reads, "Nec Fregit Lucrum 1550", and the left "Nec Fingit Discrimen." The first appears to mean; "Not in Cold Profit", the second, "Not to Discriminate," apparently deriving from the Meditations of Marcus Aurelius.

The original – signed with Eworth's "HE" monogram – was donated to the Courtauld Institute of Art by Lord Lee of Farnham in 1932. The painting was in "badly damaged" condition when given to the Institute, but has subsequently been conserved and restored. A well-preserved copy made by George Luttrell in 1591 and which now hangs at Dunster Castle was the source of much of Dame Frances Yates' research.
