= Pedro de Gamboa =

Spanish soldier (??–1550)

Pedro de Gamboa (died 1550) was a Spanish soldier who fought for Henry VIII of England in France and Scotland.

He was from Madrid.

In 1545 he commanded a company of Spanish soldiers for the Earl of Hertford. Eustace Chapuys describes him as a Maestre de Campo, a Colonel, and places him at the battle of Ancrum. In June 1545 Gamboa came to the Earl of Hertford to discuss a quarrel between two of his men. One had punched the other in the face, apparently unforgivable dishonour amongst Spanish people. They wanted to "campe", to fight a duel. Hertford said he would proclaim fighting, or accusations of lying amongst the Spaniards that might lead to duels, to be hanging offences.

By April 1547, Gamboa received a pension of £250 from the English exchequer. Gamboa fought at the battle of Pinkie, leading a troop of cavalry with firearms. Gamboa and 70 of his men joined an attack on Dalkeith Castle on 3 June 1548 in attempt to capture George Douglas of Pittendreich.

In July 1548 Gamboa's mounted arquebusiers, commanded by another Spanish captain, Pedro de Negro, rode through French lines to relieve the siege of Haddington, as an English soldier Thomas Holcroft noted. Negro's exploit was described in a Spanish chronicle now known as the Chronicle of Henry VIII. The chronicle relates that Spanish and English cavalrymen rode into Haddington carrying bags of gunpowder. They slaughtered their own horses outside the town gates, and after the French and Scottish had withdrawn, Negro buried them in three pits.

Gamboa lost his command and blamed a junior officer, Carlos de Guevara. He recruited two Spaniards to kill him. Instead they joined Guevara's company and told him of Gamboa's enmity. They decided to come to London and kill Gamboa.

Gamboa was murdered near the churchyard of St Sepulchre-without-Newgate, London, on 19 January 1550. His killer, Charles de Gavaro or Carlos de Guevara, had travelled from Scotland to assassinate him.
