= Odet de Selve =

French diplomat

Odet de Selve (c. 1504–1563) was a French diplomat.

He was the son of Jean de Selve, first president at the parliaments of Rouen and Bordeaux, vice-chancellor of Milan, and ambassador of the king of France. In 1540 Odet was appointed councillor at the parlement of Paris and in 1542 at the grand council. In 1546, after the signature of the treaty of Ardres, he was sent on an embassy to England, reporting back on the last days of Henry VIII's reign. In 1550 he was sent to Venice, and afterwards to Rome, where he obtained the election of Pope Paul IV in 1555.

A large number of Odet's diplomatic letters survive and are published. On 31 July 1548, he reported that the success of Pedro de Negro and "Captain Windent" at the siege of Haddington were the talk of the court in London, and that Mary, Queen of Scots had sailed from Scotland to France.
