= Thomas Palmer (courtier) =

English soldier and courtier

Arms of Palmer of Wingham: Or, two bars gules each charged with three trefoils of the first in chief a greyhound currant sable

Sir Thomas Palmer (died 22 August 1553) was an English soldier and courtier. His testimony was crucial in the final downfall of Edward Seymour, 1st Duke of Somerset in 1551–1552. Palmer was executed during the reign of Queen Mary I for his support of Lady Jane Grey in the succession crisis of 1553.

== Life ==
He was the youngest of the three sons of Sir Edward Palmer, by his wife, the sister and coheiress of Sir Richard Clement, of Ightham Mote, Kent. His siblings were John, Henry, and Katherine. He was early attached to the court, and in 1515 he was serving at Tournai. On 28 April 1517, he was one of the feodaries of the honour of Richmond. The same year he became bailiff of the lordship of Barton-upon-Humber, Lincolnshire. He was a gentleman-usher to King Henry VIII in 1519, and at the Field of the Cloth of Gold in 1520. On 22 August 1519, he was made overseer of petty customs, of the subsidy of tonnage and poundage, and regulator of the custom-house wherries; in 1521 he became surveyor of the lordship of Henley-in-Arden.

He served in the military expedition of 1523, and the same year had a grant of the manor of Pollicot, Buckinghamshire. The next year he had a further grant of ground in the parish of St Thomas the Apostle, London. On 10 November 1532, he was knighted by Henry VIII at Calais, where he had become captain of Newenham Bridge. He was favourably noticed by Henry VIII, who played dice with him, and in 1533 he became knight-porter of Calais. He was taken prisoner by the French in an expedition from Guisnes, and had to ransom himself. He gave an account of this and other services to Thomas Cromwell in a letter of 1534. He acted as commissioner for Calais and its marches in 1535 in the collection of the tenths of spiritualities. Palmer was at the affair of the Bridge of Arde in 1540.

In July 1543, when treasurer of Guisnes, he went with the force under Sir John Wallop against the French, and in August 1545 William Grey, 13th Baron Grey de Wilton sent him as a messenger to the King. Palmer was captain of the "Old Man" at Boulogne from 1544 to 1546, presumably resigning it to his brother. When Henry VIII died, Palmer had secured a reputation for courage.

=== Rough Wooing and the siege of Haddington ===
The Protector Edward Seymour, 1st Duke of Somerset, who advised King Edward VI, became an enemy of Palmer. Palmer was sent to serve on the border with Scotland during the war of the Rough Wooing.

In January 1548 Palmer and the Italian military engineer "Master John" made plans to improve the fortifications at Broughty Castle near Dundee. Palmer reported to Grey of Wilton that the ground by the castle was rocky and impossible to dig with a spade, and the site was overlooked by a nearby hill. In 1548 he several times distinguished himself by bringing provisions into Haddington. Edward VI heard of these exploits and mentioned Palmer and Thomas Holcroft in his journal. Holcroft suffered a bad defeat as a commander of a company of lances in an expedition from Berwick. He continued to hold his appointments at Calais. On 11 June 1550 he was sent with Sir Richard Lee to view the forts on the Scottish border, and provide for their repair.

=== Somerset's fall and Lady Jane Grey ===
Palmer, on 7 October 1551, was the first to disclose Somerset's treason, the declaration being made in the Earl of Warwick's garden. He had evidently hoped to rise with Warwick, shortly known as John Dudley, 1st Duke of Northumberland. Having secured several monastic grants, he was building himself a house in the Strand. On 18 February 1552, he had a pardon for all treasons, clearing him from suspicion as a former follower of Somerset; and on 3 March following he was appointed a commissioner for the division of the debatable land on the borders.

He was an adherent of Lady Jane Grey, and had been too prominent to escape when Northumberland fell. He was sent to the Tower of London on 25 July 1553, arraigned and condemned on 19 August 1553. Palmer was the only accused man on that day to protest: he shouted that the judges themselves had formed Jane's council; that they deserved as much or more punishment than him; that the trial was unlawful. He was brought out for execution on 22 August, with Sir John Gates and the Duke of Northumberland. He had heard mass before execution, and taken the sacrament in one kind; but when he came on the scaffold, covered with the blood of those who had just been beheaded, he made a speech in which he said that he died a Protestant.

== Family ==
Of Sir Thomas's two elder brothers, the first, Sir John, known as 'Buskin Palmer' or 'Long Palmer', was sheriff of Surrey and Sussex successively in 1533 and 1543. Palmer [John] was a sick man when he made his will on 7 January 1563 and he died before the day was out. His second brother was Sir Henry Palmer (d. 1559), of Wingham in Kent. Sir Henry married Jane, daughter of Sir Richard Windebank of Guisnes, and left three sons — Sir Thomas Palmer 'the Travailer,' Arnold, and Edward. His sister Katherine Palmer (d. 15 December 1576) was abbess of Syon Abbey during its peregrination in the Netherlands, responsible for preserving the only English religious community to continue unbroken through the Reformation.

== See also ==
- Attainder of Duke of Northumberland and others Act 1553
