= James Wilsford =

Member of the Parliament of England

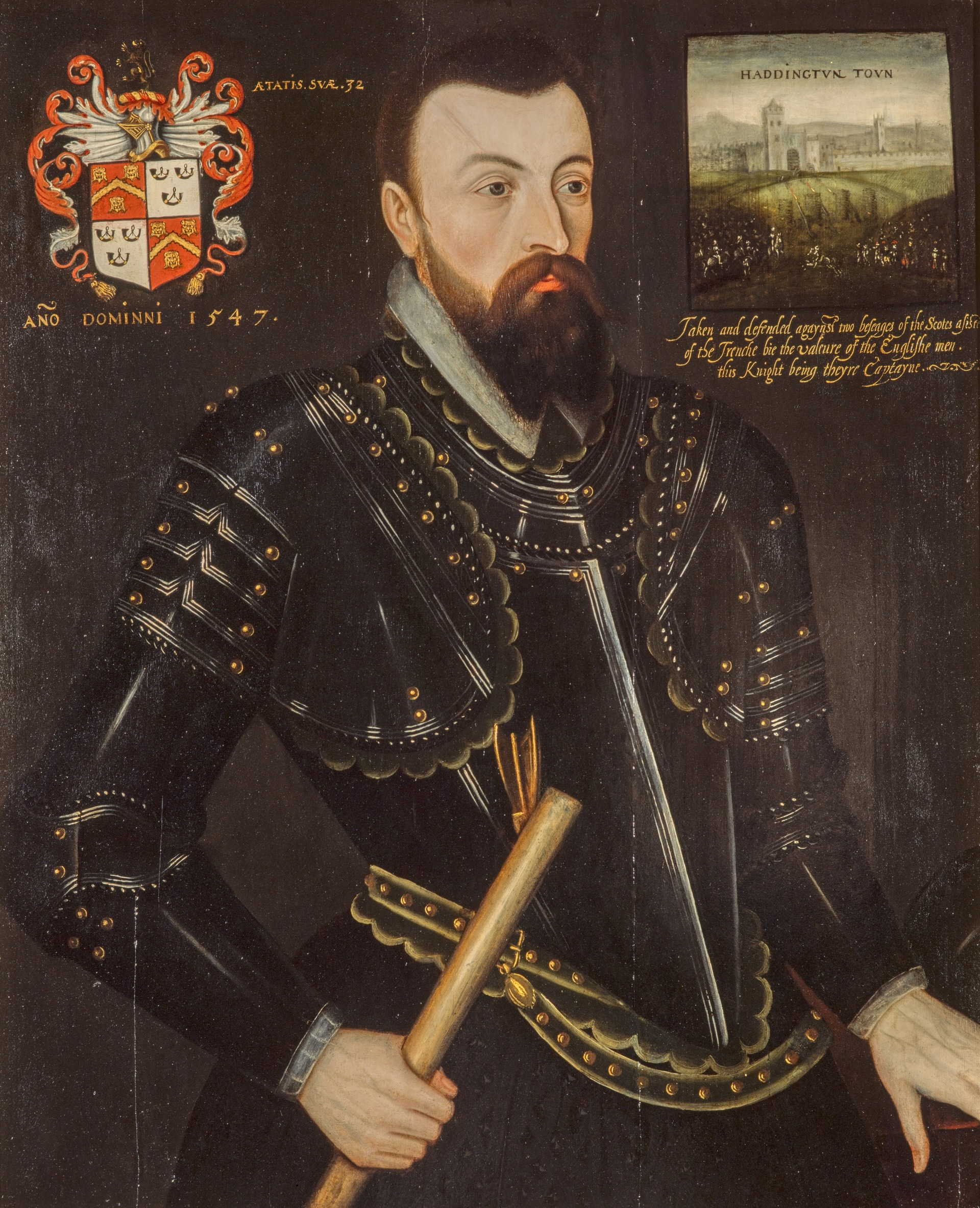
Sir James Wilsford

Sir James Wilsford or Wilford (about 1516–1550) was an English soldier and politician, who was commander at the Siege of Haddington in the war known as the Rough Wooing and also sat as Member of Parliament for Barnstaple.

== Origins ==
James Wilsford was born about the year 1516, the son of Thomas Wilsford (died 1553), a landowner at Hartridge in the parish of Cranbrook in Kent, and his first wife Elizabeth (died by 1531), daughter of Walter Culpeper, of Bedgebury in Kent. They had four sons and nine daughters. His father's second wife was Rose, daughter of William Whetenhall of Hextall's Court, Kent, with a further five sons and a daughter, Cecily (died 1584), who married Edwin Sandys, Archbishop of York One of his brothers was the soldier and politician Sir Thomas Wilsford (died 1610).

== In Scotland ==
Wilsford was a Provost Marshal at the Battle of Pinkie Cleugh on 10 September 1547 and was subsequently knighted. Ulpian Fulwell wrote of Sir James in his Flower of Fame (1575);

"He was so noble a capitaine, that he wonne the hartes of all Souldiers. He was in the towne among his Souldiers and friends, a gentle lamme. In the field amongst his enemies a Lyon.

Sir James was one of the captains who supervised and garrisoned the fort at Lauder, the future site of Thirlestane Castle, in April 1548. Lord Grey of Wilton recommended him for the command of the English and Italian mercenary force occupying Haddington on 28 April. On 3 June 1548, Wilford and Thomas Wyndham captured Dalkeith Palace, burnt the town, and took prisoner James Douglas, the future Regent Morton. On 1 November 1548, Wilford wrote to Protector Somerset describing the state of Haddington, with a garrison stricken by plague:

"The state of this town pities me both to see and to write it; but I hope for relief. Many are sick and a great number dead, most of the plague. On my faith there are not here this day of horse, foot and Yttalians 1000 able to got the walls, and more like to be sick, than the sick to mend, who watch the walls every 5th night, yet the walls are un-manned."

== Capture ==
Wilsford was captured at Dunbar in January 1549. One account relates his capture by Robert Lauder of the Bass while supervising a wagon train of provisions. The French soldier Jean de Beaugué also included the event in his History of the War in Scotland. Mary of Guise described his capture as a "bonne prise", a good catch, in a letter to her brother, the Duke of Aumale. James Croft succeeded him in command at Haddington.

A legal record narrates that Wilford was held by a French soldier, Captain Escho, and transferred into the keeping of Thomas, Master of Erskine, a son of the keeper of Stirling Castle, John Erskine, 5th Lord Erskine. By June 1549, Wilford was imprisoned at Stirling Castle where he was visited by an English herald. The English Privy Council wrote to the Earl of Rutland to organize his release by an exchange of prisoners. Wilford was valued as a "man of special service" and "someone who has notably served", but was now "vexed with much sickness." It was suggested he might be exchanged for the son of Lord Fleming. Wilford was transferred to the keeping of Janet Stewart, Lady Fleming, and was released sometime in November 1549.

In February and March 1550, Wilsford was granted the keeping of the Bailiwick of Gravesend and Milton and the Little Park of Otford, Kent for his lifetime.

James Wilsford died in November 1550, and his eulogy was delivered by Miles Coverdale. He was buried at St. Bartholomew's by the Exchange in London. A brass plate from his monument engraved with the Barrett and Wilford arms is preserved at the Museum of London. Coverdale was also buried at St Bartholomew's.

== Family ==
He married Joyce Barrett, who soon after his death married Thomas Stanley, later an Under-Treasurer of the Mint, who in 1553 became guardian of Wilford's only son Thomas.

== Portrait ==
Wilford's portrait was painted, perhaps by Hans Eworth; four copies of this portrait survive, three versions show a view of Haddington. The portraits are (retrospectively) dated 1547 and give Wilford's age as 32.
