= William Grey, 13th Baron Grey de Wilton =

English baron

William Grey
- 13th Baron Grey de Wilton
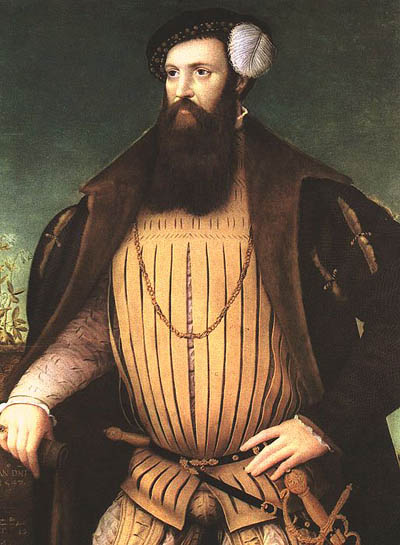
- An unknown nobleman, thought to be Lord Grey de Wilton in 1547, by Gerlach Flicke, National Gallery of Scotland

Baron Grey de Wilton
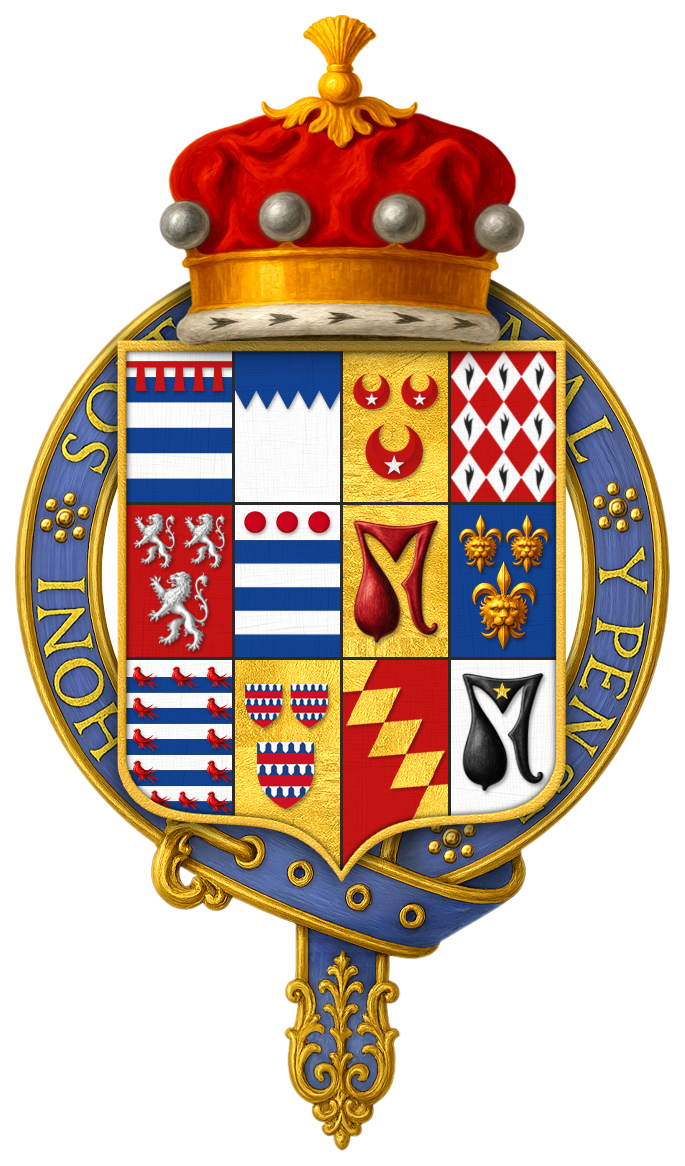
- Coat of arms
- Tenure: 1520 – 14 December 1562
- Predecessor: Richard Grey, 12th Baron Grey de Wilton
- Successor: Arthur Grey, 14th Baron Grey de Wilton
- Born: 1508/9; Wilton Castle, Hertfordshire, England
- Died: 14 December 1562; Cheshunt, Hertfordshire, England
- Family: Grey
- Spouse: Lady Mary Somerset of Worcester
- Issue: Arthur Grey, 14th Baron Grey de Wilton; Honora Grey-Denny; William Grey
- Father: Edmund Grey, 9th Baron Grey de Wilton
- Mother: Florence Hastings

William Grey, 13th Baron Grey de Wilton KG (1508/1509 – 14 December 1562), was an English baron and military commander serving in France in the 1540s and 1550s, and in the Scottish Wars of the 1540s.

== Early life ==
Grey was the thirteenth Baron Grey de Wilton, fourth son of Edmund Grey, 9th Baron Grey de Wilton (died 1511) and Florence Hastings, eldest daughter of Sir Ralph Hastings. (Note: His three brothers, the tenth, eleventh, and twelfth barons, died in their minority.) He was first summoned to parliament on 3 November 1529, by King Henry VIII of England.

== Service in France, 1544–1547 ==
During the Italian War of 1542–1546, Grey was a commander in the expedition against France in 1544, under John, lord Russell, and assisted in the siege of Montreuil. There seems to have been some jealousy between Grey and the Earl of Surrey. Grey had been appointed chief captain of the army called 'the Crews,' and it was arranged in 1545 that this command should be transferred to Surrey, while Grey was to be appointed lieutenant of Boulogne under Lord Poynings. Upon letters from Guînes, however, the king, Henry VIII, ordered Grey to remain in command of his army, while Surrey was sent to Boulogne. Secretary Paget speaks of the sinister means constantly employed to set these noblemen at variance. Grey finally superseded Surrey as lieutenant of Boulogne in April 1546. During the French campaign, Grey distinguished himself greatly, especially by his destruction of the Châtillon fortress, which he razed to the ground. The king took Grey into favour, and promised him rewards and preferment, but the promise failed in consequence of the king's death.

== Military service in Scotland ==
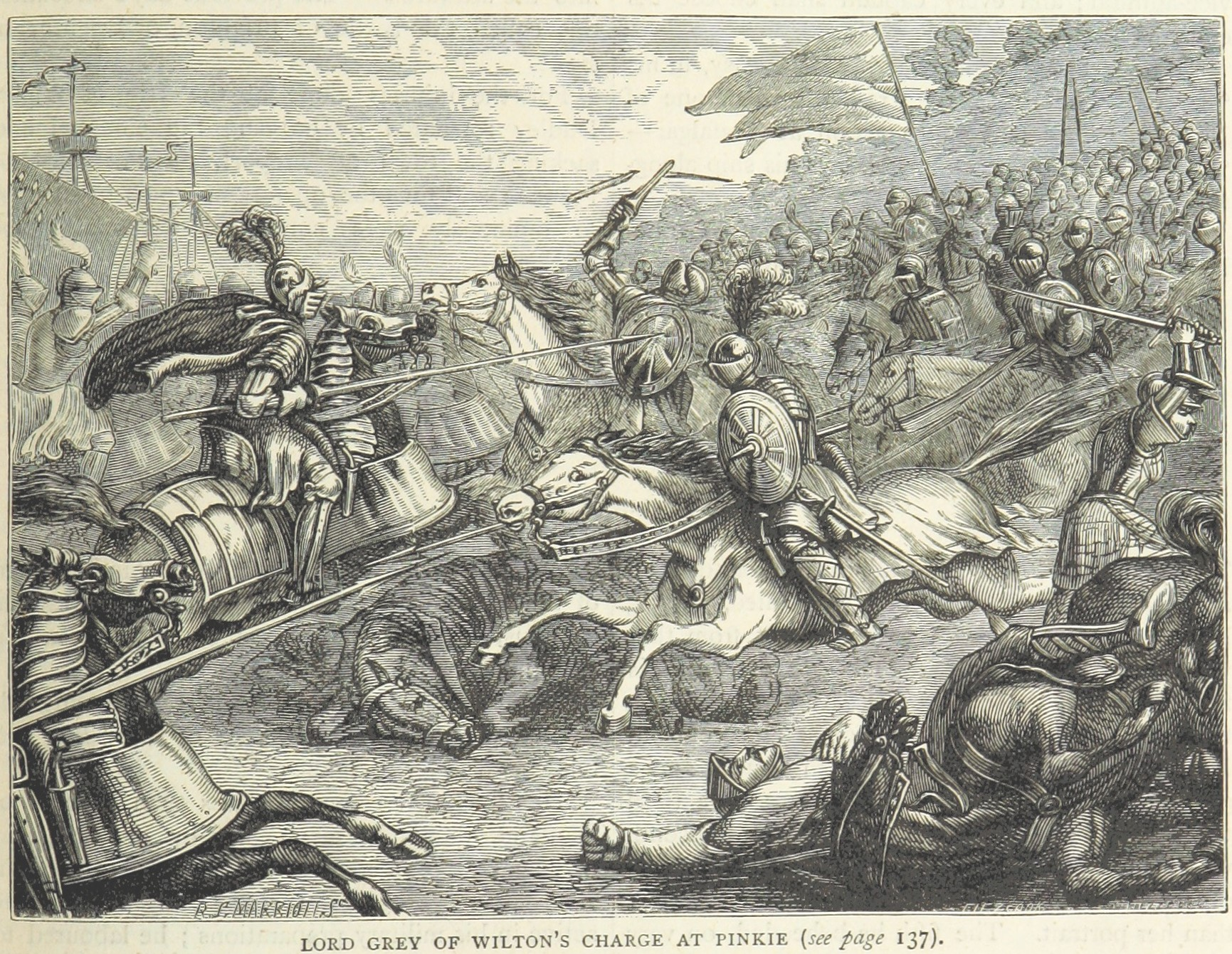
Grey at Pinkie Cleugh

In the first year of Edward VI, Grey, then a field marshal and captain-general of horse, was sent into Scotland. He placed himself at the head of the army to make the first charge against the enemy at the battle of Pinkie Cleugh, on 10 September 1547. His son described Grey's injuries in the battle:

In this battle [Grey] receaved a greate wounde in the mouthe with a pyke, sutche as clave one of his teethe, strake hym thowroghe the tongue, and three fyngers deepe into the rouff of his mouthe: yet notwithstondyng hee poursued owte the chase, wheryn, whot with the aboundance of blood, heate of the weather, and dust of the press, hee had surely been suffocated had not the Duke of Northehumberland, then earle of Warwyck, lyghted and lyfted a fyrcken of ale too hys head, as they passed thowroughe the Scottische camp

— Arthur, Lord Grey, Commentaries

Grey recovered, and twelve days later (22 September) was appointed to complete the delivery of Hume Castle. On the 28th he was knighted by Protector Somerset at Berwick. The protector returned to England, and Grey was left as governor of Berwick, warden of the east marches, and general of the northern parts. On 18 April 1548 Grey and Sir Thomas Palmer again crossed the border, and advanced to Haddington, which they took and elaborately fortified. After spending six weeks improving the defences, they left a garrison of 2,500 men in charge and departed, burning Dalkeith and laying waste to the country for six miles around Edinburgh while making a leisurely withdrawal to Berwick.

== "The commotion time" ==
There were disturbances throughout England during the summer of 1549, a period that came to be known as "the commotion time." In July 1549, Grey was despatched at the head of fifteen hundred horse and foot into Oxfordshire, where he immediately restored order, though not without using considerable severity against the priests who had instigated the disturbances. He then marched into the West Country, and joining the Earl of Bedford, rendered signal service in the pacification of Devon and Cornwall during the Prayer Book Rebellion.

== Politics during the succession ==
In 1551 Grey was held in the Tower as one of the partisans of Somerset who was the Protector of Edward VI during his minority. After the execution of the Protector, Grey was set at liberty. Having recovered the royal favour, Grey was appointed governor of the castle of Guisnes in the Pale of Calais. Upon the death of Edward VI, Grey joined the Duke of Northumberland in his abortive attempt to place Lady Jane Grey upon the throne. The movement in favour of Lady Jane collapsed, and on 21 and 22 July 1553 Grey and other compromised persons obtained pardon. Nevertheless, an act of attainder was passed against them.

== Service in France, 1553–1558 ==
A few days after his submission Grey received a commission to array 350 footmen and fifty demi-lancers in the counties of Middlesex and Kent, and the city of London, for the garrison of Guînes. When war was formally declared by the French in 1557, Guînes was so poorly garrisoned that Grey reported that unless he was reinforced he was at the mercy of the enemy. A small detachment was sent over; but although Grey had more than a thousand men, a part only of these were English, the rest being Burgundians and Spanish. By the middle of winter moreover, there was a scarcity of food at Guînes and Calais. On 1 December Grey announced a successful expedition for the destruction of a French detachment. 'The commander of Guînes was a fierce, stern man,' says Froude, 'and his blood being hot he blew up the church of Bushing, with the steeple thereof, and all the French soldiers entrenched there perished.' A formidable French force having appeared at Abbeville on 22 December, Grey and Wentworth wrote an urgent joint letter to the queen. Orders were at length given for reinforcements, but these were countermanded on a mistaken report that the alarm was ill-founded. The French appeared under the walls of Guînes on the 31st; Calais was invested on 1 January 1557–8.

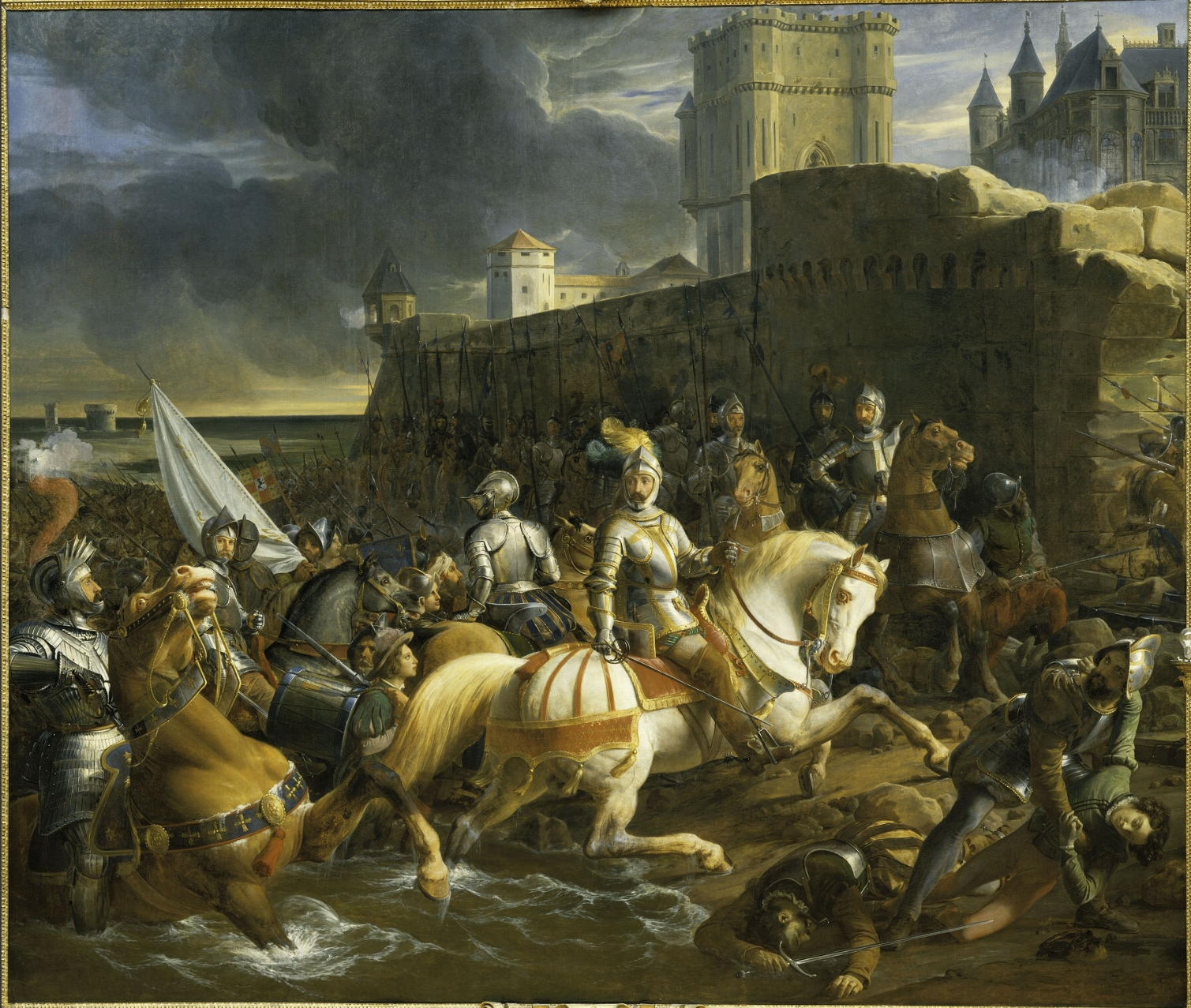
The Siege of Calais by François-Édouard Picot, 1838

Grey made a brave effort to save Guînes. On the night of the 4th, he sent a letter urgently begging for reinforcements, but Calais fell on 6 January. All the English counties were thereupon called on by proclamation to contribute their musters. Thirty thousand men were rapidly on their way to the coast, and on the 10th came the queen's command for the army to cross to Dunkirk, join the Duke of Savoy, and save Guînes. But severe weather was experienced in the Channel, and the fleet was either destroyed or dispersed. Meanwhile, Guînes was left to its fate. Grey, with his eleven hundred men, abandoned the town, burnt the houses, and withdrew into the castle. The French, under the Duke of Guise, bombarded the place, and on the third day (19 January) attempted a storm. Grey was wounded by accidentally treading on a sword, and the first line of defence was taken. His soldiers refused to fight longer, and Grey was soon forced to surrender.

The Duke of Guise transferred Grey to Marshal Piero Strozzi, who in turn passed his prisoner to the Comte de La Rouchefoucauld, and he remained in captivity until ransomed by the payment of twenty thousand crowns, which considerably impaired his fortune, and entailed the selling of his ancient castle of Wilton-upon-Wye. Grey was elected a knight of the Garter in April 1558; but being then a prisoner in France, Garter king-at-arms Sir Gilbert Dethick was sent to notify his election. He was installed on 19 April 1558 by his proxy, Sir Humphrey Ratclyffe. On an extension of the armistice with France in January 1559, Grey was sent over to England with proposals for a secret peace. Grey received summonses as a peer of parliament from Henry VIII, Edward VI, Mary, and Elizabeth. But his honours, which were forfeited by the Act of Attainder of 1553, were not fully restored till after Elizabeth's accession (1558).

== Warden of the Marches ==
In December 1559 Grey was constituted governor of Berwick, warden of the middle marches towards Scotland, and warden of Tynedale and Redesdale. He went down to the border with two thousand men nominally to reinforce the Berwick garrison, but at first with a large latitude of action. After the Treaty of Berwick was signed, he was soon made general of the English army sent 'in aid of the Scots against the French, who had made an invasion there with great forces.' On 28 March 1560 Grey, with Lord Scrope, Sir Henry Percy, and others, crossed the river Tweed with six thousand foot and two thousand horse. He moved by easy marches, and on 4 April the Protestant lords of the congregation joined him at Prestonpans. He was annoyed to find that their men had been engaged for twenty days only, twelve of which had already expired; but finding Leith too strong to be attacked without reinforcements, he proposed to use the Scotch force at once by seizing Edinburgh Castle, where the queen-regent had taken refuge with Erskine. The Scots were apathetic, and Grey referred to Thomas Howard, 4th Duke of Norfolk, for advice. Howard would not sanction the scheme for taking the castle without the knowledge of Elizabeth, and the queen, on being appealed to, forbade Grey to think of it. He was ordered either to compose matters without force or bloodshed or else to finish the work at once, 'for the navy could not be suffered to remain'. Fighting began before Leith, but it was interrupted by an armistice, concluded to give time for Howard to go to London for instructions. Grey was incensed at being compelled to rest upon his arms. After conferences with the Duke of Châtellerault and the Scottish lords, the peace proposals fell through.

The siege of Leith at once began, and on 30 April a third of the town was destroyed by fire. But there were complaints of Grey's dilatory action. The blockade failed. Grey resolved to take the place by assault. This took place on 7 May. The attack was repulsed with heavy loss, half the officers and eight hundred men being left dead and wounded in the trenches. Grey clung tenaciously to his ground, dreading only that he might be driven from it before assistance could arrive. Cecil wrote at this time, 'My Lord Grey is a noble, valiant, painful, and careful gentleman,' but his failure was patent. Negotiations were set on foot, and a treaty was concluded at Edinburgh, peace being proclaimed in Leith on Sunday, 7 July. Grey was left governor of Berwick and warden of both the marches, but afterwards Sir John Forster took the middle marches with Grey's consent; the other two offices Grey kept until he died.

== Retirement and death ==
In December 1560 Grey hosted Scottish ambassadors at Berwick and gave the Earl of Morton a personal tour of the latest fortifications. Grey retired from active command in 1561 and left Berwick for the south. He died at Cheshunt, near Waltham in Hertfordshire, on 14 December 1562, in the house of his daughter and son-in-law, Henry Denny (son of Sir Anthony Denny), and was buried in the parish church there, near to the communion-table.

== Family ==
In about 1535, Grey married Lady Mary Somerset of Worcester, the daughter of Charles Somerset, 1st Earl of Worcester by his second wife, Elizabeth West. They had three children:

- Arthur Grey, 14th Baron Grey de Wilton (1536–1593), who married, firstly, Dorothy la Zouche, illegitimate daughter of Richard la Zouche, 9th Baron Zouche of Haryngworth. He married secondly, Jane Morrison, daughter of Sir Richard Morrison, and the widow of Edward Russell.
- Honora Grey (1540 - 28 August 1569), married Henry Denny, Dean of Chester (d. 24 March 1574), son of Sir Anthony Denny. Their son was Edward Denny, 1st Earl of Norwich.
- William Grey, who Married Rebecca Shaw, daughter of Richard Shaw and Elizabeth Cavendish, who in turn, was niece of Charles Brandon, 1st Duke of Suffolk, and cousin of Lady Jane Grey. They had a son called Richard Grey.

== Bibliography ==
- Cokayne, George Edward (1982). The Complete Peerage of England, Scotland, Ireland, Great Britain and the United Kingdom, Extant, Extinct or Dormant, Vol, VI. Gloucester: A. Sutton. ISBN 0-904387-82-8.
- Grey, Arthur (1847). Philip de Malpas Grey Egerton (ed.). A commentary of the services and charges of William Lord Grey of Wilton, by his son Arthur Grey. London: Camden Society.
- Lock, Julian (January 2008) [September 2004]. "Grey, William, thirteenth Baron Grey of Wilton (1508/9–1562)". Oxford Dictionary of National Biography (online ed.). Oxford University Press. doi:10.1093/ref:odnb/11568. (Subscription, Wikipedia Library access or UK public library membership required.)
- Mosley, Charles, ed. (2003). Burke's Peerage, Baronetage & Knightage (107th ed.). Wilmington, Delaware, U.S.A.: Burke's Peerage (Genealogical Books). 3 volumes
- Richardson, Douglas (2011). Everingham, Kimball G. (ed.). Magna Carta Ancestry: A Study in Colonial and Medieval Families, Vol, IV (2nd ed.). Salt Lake City, UT: Douglas Richardson. ISBN 978-1460992708.
- This article incorporates text from a publication now in the public domain: Smith, George Barnett (1890). "Grey, William (d.1562)". In Stephen, Leslie; Lee, Sidney (eds.). Dictionary of National Biography. Vol. 23. London: Smith, Elder & Co. pp. 213, 215.

Peerage of England
Preceded by Edward Grey	Baron Grey de Wilton; 1520–1562	Succeeded by Arthur Grey
