= Progresses of Mary, Queen of Scots =

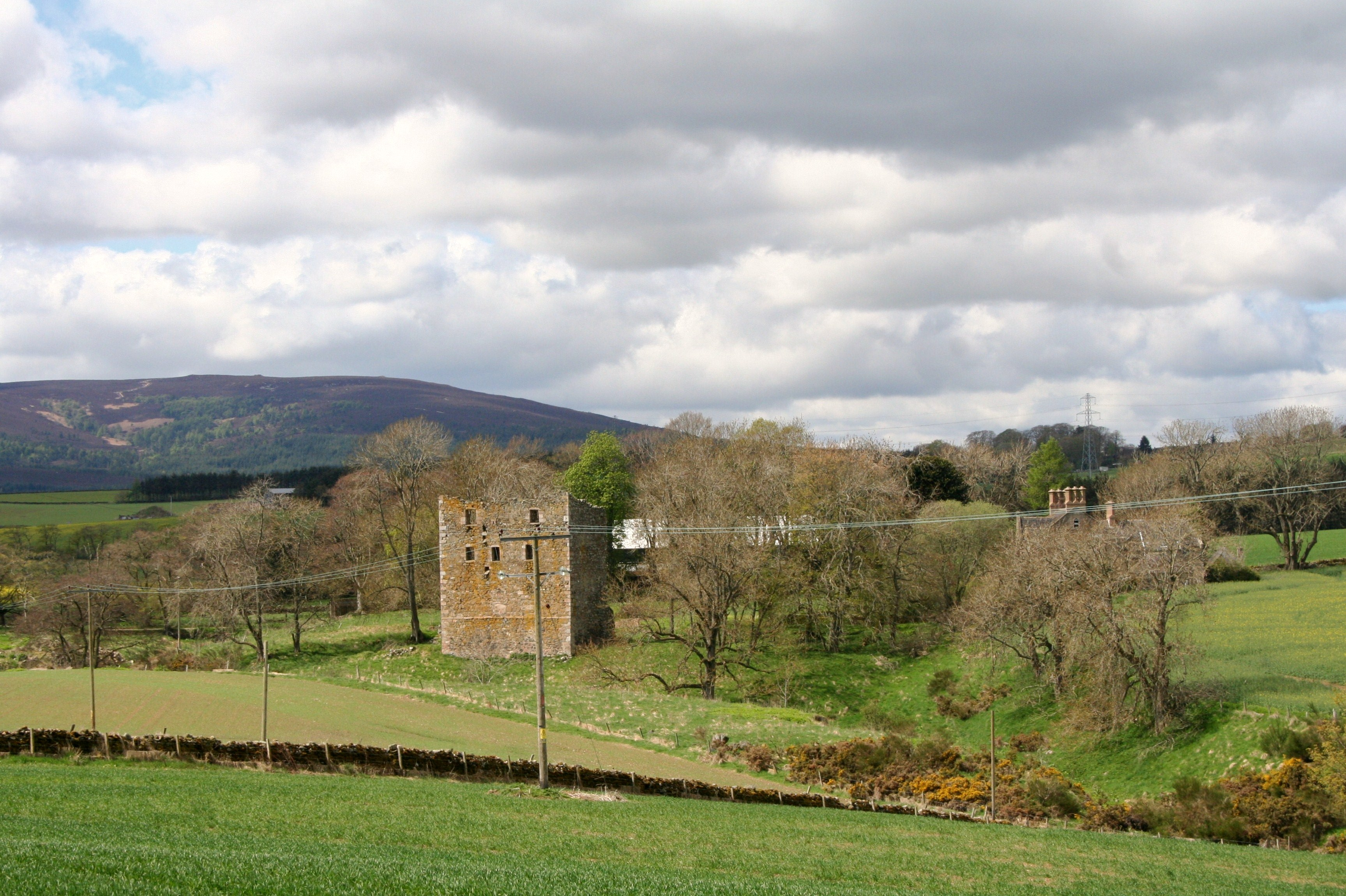
Queen Mary stayed at Balquhain Castle on 1 September 1562.

Mary, Queen of Scots, made three significant progresses in Scotland after her return from France in 1561 and before her marriage to Lord Darnley in 1565. Sources for her movements include letters, financial records, and the account of household expenses held by the National Records of Scotland known as the Despences de la Maison Royale. Travel, especially for the purpose of holding justice courts, was an important component of successful rule in medieval and early modern Scotland.

== The north in 1562 ==
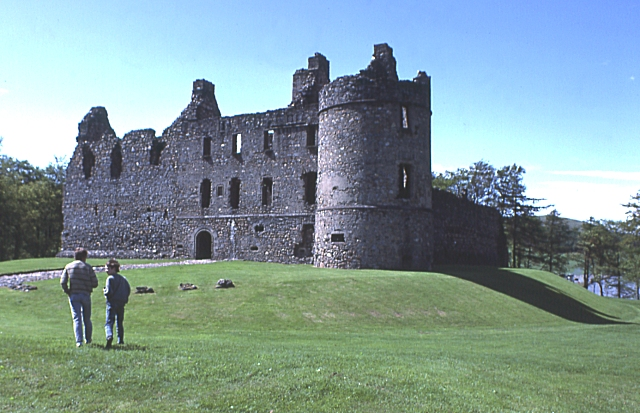
Balvenie Castle belonged to the Earl of Atholl

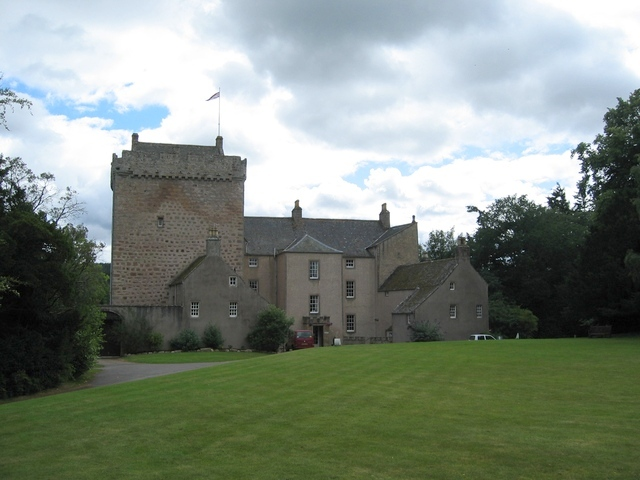
Mary stayed at Kilravock Castle on 15 September 1562

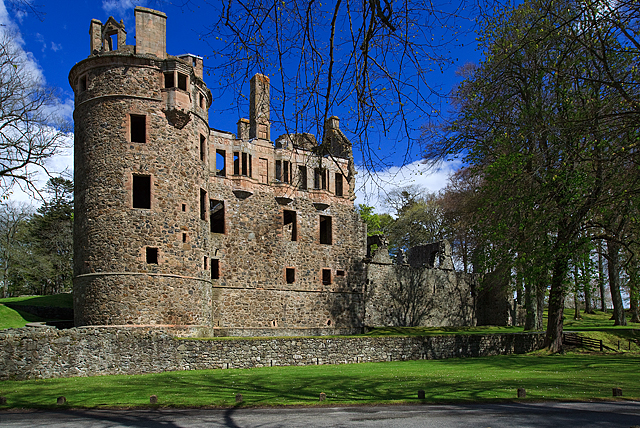
Mary avoided Huntly Castle and sent Lord Coldingham to arrest the Earl of Huntly

In 1562, Mary, Queen of Scots, visited the north of Scotland. She had previously hoped to travel to England for an "interview" with her cousin Elizabeth I. The English ambassador Thomas Randolph was invited to join her, and he wrote to William Cecil that the journey would last "two months and more" and was "rather devised by herself, than greatly approved by her Council".

On her journey north, Mary visited Glamis, Edzell Castle, hosted by Katherine Campbell, Countess of Crawford, and Dunnotar Castle, on the way to Old Aberdeen. Declining to visit Huntly Castle (Strathbogie) and refused entry to Inverness Castle, she took action against George Gordon, 4th Earl of Huntly. Mary visited Balquhain Castle on 1 September, Rothiemay on 2 September, and Gartly Castle before the siege of Inverness Castle.

After two days at Balvenie Castle, Mary, Queen of Scots, crossed the River Spey by ferry boat at Boharm on 6 September as she travelled to Elgin. The boat cost 40 shillings and her almoner Pierre Rorie gave money to poor folk in Boharm and other places along the route. On 15 September 1562, she was at Kilravock Castle then at Darnaway Castle.

Mary was conveyed between Inverness and Spey and Elgin and Banff by "captains of the Highland men" hired by George Munro of Davochgartie (Dochcarty) and Milntown (died 1576). Munro was Captain of Dingwall Castle and was appointed keeper of Inverness Castle. Munro wrote a history of the Mackintosh family. His work does not survive but was used a source by Lachlan Mackintosh of Kinrara. According to this Mackintosh history, Lachlan Mor Mackintosh and the men of Badenoch caused John Gordon of Findlater to retreat from the vicinity of Inverness, and the Clan Chattan, the Frasers, and the Munros supported Mary at Inverness.

The English ambassador Thomas Randolph, whose letters include a commentary on this progress, wrote that Mary was intoxicated by excitement, that he "never saw her merrier", and she wished she were a man to lie all night in the fields, and wear armour and carry a sword on the high road. She stayed two nights at Spynie Palace. At Inverness, she bought gunpowder and 15 tartan plaids for her lackeys and members of her household.

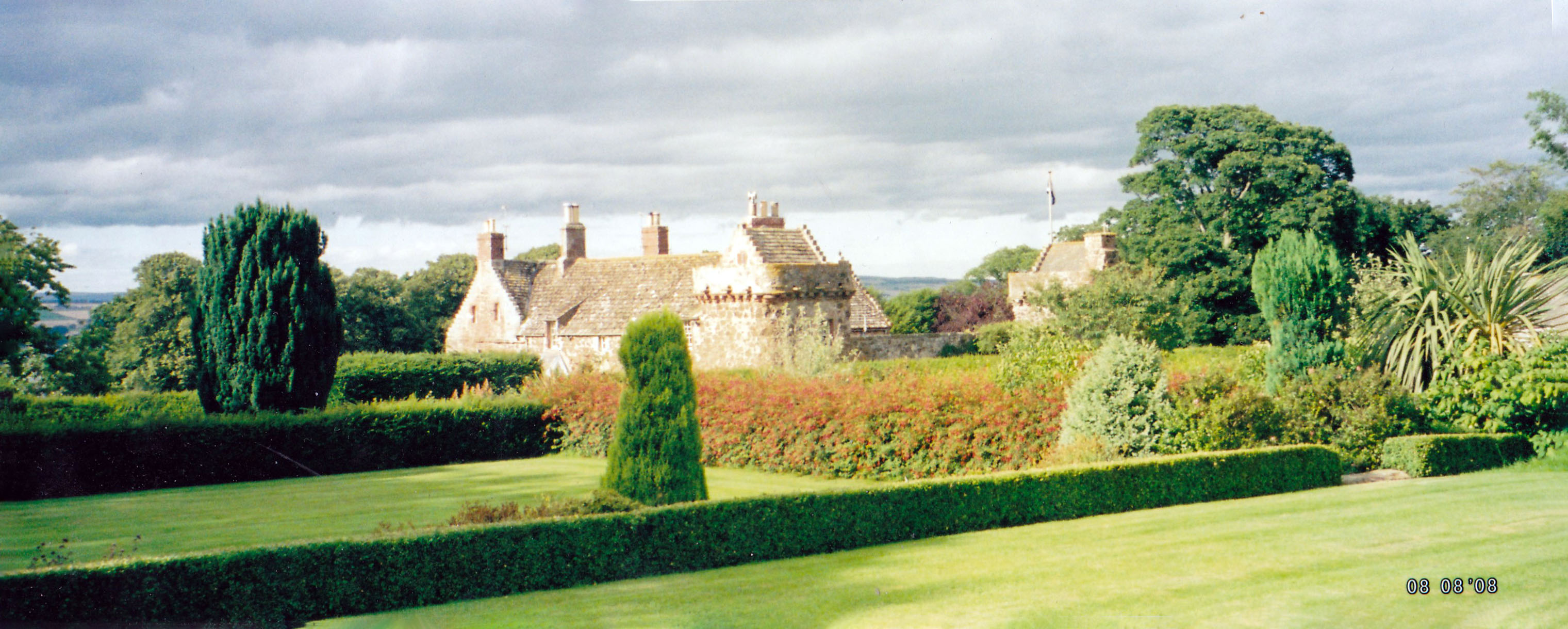
Craig House, near Montrose

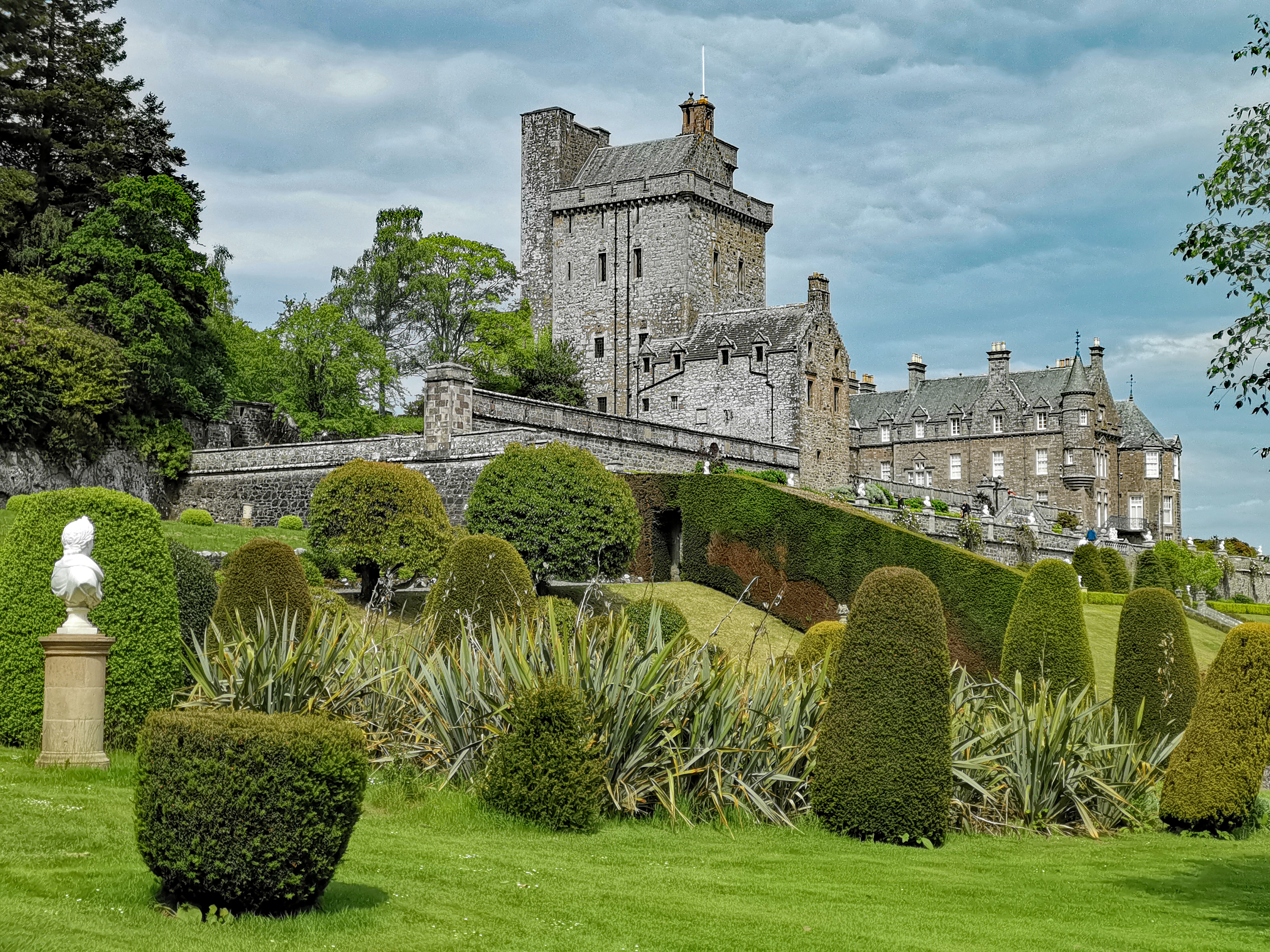
Mary visited Drummond Castle on 17 November 1562 and 24 December 1566

Mary was welcomed at Aberdeen with "spectacles, plays, and interludes" and given a silver gilt cup filled with 500 gold crowns, and wine, coal, and wax (candles) for use during her stay. The burgh council organised a tax on residents to pay for this and a volley of cannon shot at Mary's "first entry" to Aberdeen. The Gordon family was defeated at the Battle of Corrichie on 28 October, and Mary was said to have witnessed the execution of John Gordon of Findlater at Aberdeen.

Making her way south, she visited Dunnottar Castle, where she met Bartholomew de Villemore who brought her letters from France. Robert Lindsay of Pitscottie wrote that she visited Bonnyton near Montrose, Arbroath, Dundee, and Perth, while the Despences record shows that she also visited Craig Castle and Kincardine Castle near Fettercairn. Charles McKean notes that the architecture of Craig could be suitable for the "travelling royal circus" if tents were pitched in the large courtyard. From Perth, Mary visited Tullibardine Castle and Drummond Castle, and then returned to Stirling Castle.

Mary confirmed John Grant of Freuchy as keeper of the Gordon Drumin Castle on 4 November 1562. In December, George Munro was replaced as keeper of Inverness Castle by John Ross, the Provost of Inverness. On 12 February 1563, she gave Findlater Castle to James Ogilvie of Cardell and on 4 June 1563 she gave some of John Gordon's properties near Banff to "John Stewart, Lord Darnley", the Darnley title was then used by John Stewart, Commendator of Coldingham.

There are difficulties in explaining Mary's action against the Gordons of Huntly, or Huntly's rebellion. The Earl of Huntly had recently opposed Mary over plans for the English "interview" and resented the gifts of the Earldoms of Mar and Moray to Mary's brother James Stewart. John Guy describes the progress taking a "sinister turn" against the Earl of Huntly when Mary arrived at Aberdeen. Mary may have hoped to resolve her differences with the Earl, after prompting an act of submission or display of obedience. Jenny Wormald points to the family's record of loyalty and service to the Scottish crown, and argues that in "a messy and curious episode" Mary punished a Catholic ally in order to reward her brother as part of a policy focussed on hopes of her succession to the English crown.

== The west and Argyll in 1563 ==
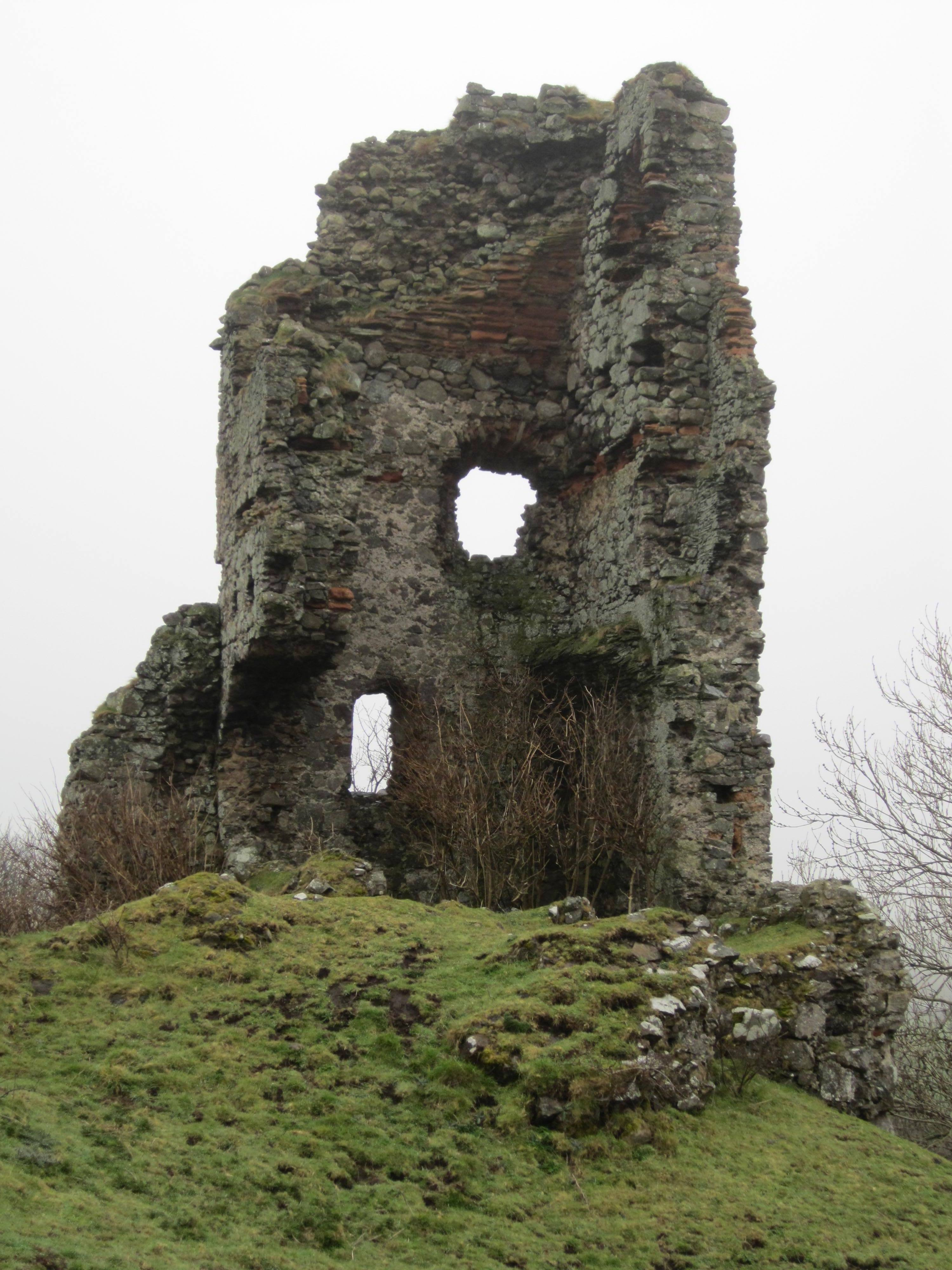
Mary came to Ardstinchar Castle on 8 August 1563

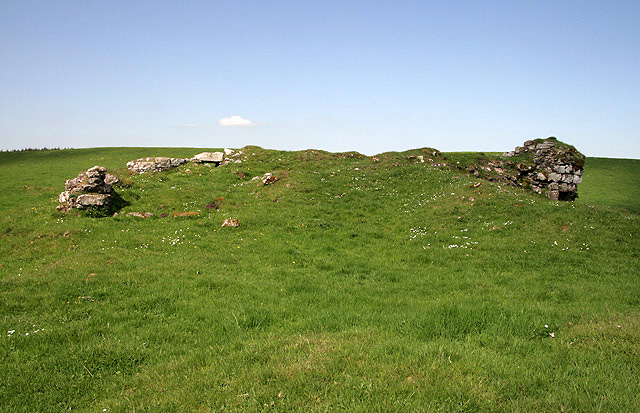
Hospitality at Cowthally Castle was legendary

Mary went to Glasgow and Dumbarton Castle in July 1563. Unlike other royal progresses, Mary did not set out to hold justice courts or "ayres" in the region. John Knox and John Lesley wrote that she spent the summer hunting. She and her companions wore "Hieland apparell", some items were gifts from Agnes Campbell of Dunyvaig. Thomas Randolph prepared an outfit, but was recalled to England before he had to wear "a saffron shirt or a Highland plaid". He reported that Mary and the Scottish court had stopped wearing mourning clothes in May.

The wardrobe accounts mention white fabrics to line a box and "plette" to wrap Mary's coifs and jewels "pour porter au voyage que la Royne fit en Arguylle", for carriage on the Queen's journey to Argyll. The French word "plette" can also mean a plaid or arisaid, Mary's tailor Baltazar Hully made "une plette bigaree" for Mary to wear in Argyll. The "plette" for the jewels was given to Mademoiselle de Raullet, the wife of Mary's French secretary.

The sum of £250 Scots was allocated by Sandy Durham to John Broun for the expenses of the remainder of Mary's household who stayed at Holyrood Palace for the two months of the progress.

Governance was not wholly abandoned, as Mary took the privy seal with her and issued official letters and grants at various locations in July and August, notably confirming arrangements for a bursary for five students at the University of Glasgow. She granted property on South Uist to James MacDonald, 6th of Dunnyveg, the husband of Agnes Campbell.

At Rossdhu Castle on 17 July 1563, Mary and her household ate a fish supper including salmon, ling, and trout cooked in butter. Mary visited Inveraray Castle and Dunoon Castle, the home of Lady Jean Stewart, and Toward Castle on 29 July. She crossed the River Clyde to Southannan near Fairlie, North Ayrshire.

On 1 August she was at a house or castle of the Earl of Eglinton. Continuing her progress in August, she went to St John's Tower in Ayr, then visited Dunure Castle (belonging to Gilbert Kennedy, 4th Earl of Cassilis), Ardmillan Castle, and Ardstinchar Castle. After staying at Glenluce Abbey on 10 August, she visited Whithorn Priory, noted as "Coustorne" by the French clerk. Next she went to Clary, a palace of the Bishops of Galloway near Causeway End and Baltersan, where her host may have been Alexander Stewart of Garlies Castle, before crossing the River Cree at Newton Stewart. On 13 August she was at Kenmure Castle.

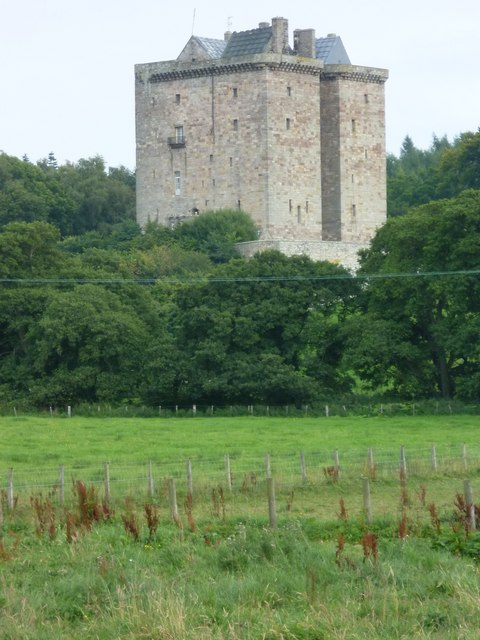
Mary came to Borthwick Castle on 28 August 1563

Mary was hosted by Robert Richardson at St Mary's Isle Priory. At Dumfries her host was the Master of Maxwell, John Maxwell, later Lord Herries. At Drumlanrig Castle the host was James Douglas, and at Crawfordjohn, she may have been received by John Carmichael, as Captain of Crawfordjohn.

Mary's party had 18 hackney riding horses, with three or more other hackneys, rising to 31 horses at Peebles, and 6 mules, and their hay, oats, and pasturage was recorded. The clerk wrote of horses eating hay in the stalls or on the grass, tant a la paille, qu'a l'herbe.

The party visited Cowthally Castle on 25 August, then returning toward Edinburgh, Peebles, Skirling (home of James Cockburn of Skirling). At Borthwick Castle, Mary sent her French secretary Raullet to England with her letters, and next visited Dalhousie Castle and Roslin Castle. Randolph met her at Craigmillar Castle on 1 September.

John Knox disapproved of Mary's Catholic faith, and he wrote to William Cecil that the progress had an adverse effect in Ayrshire, discouraging and dejecting many Protestant hearts. After Mary returned from this progress, her three half-brothers went to Inverness and held justice courts. According to Knox, they caused two women accused of witchcraft to be burnt. A Witchcraft Act had been made in Parliament in June. John Stewart, Commendator of Coldingham died at Inverness.

== The north in 1564 ==
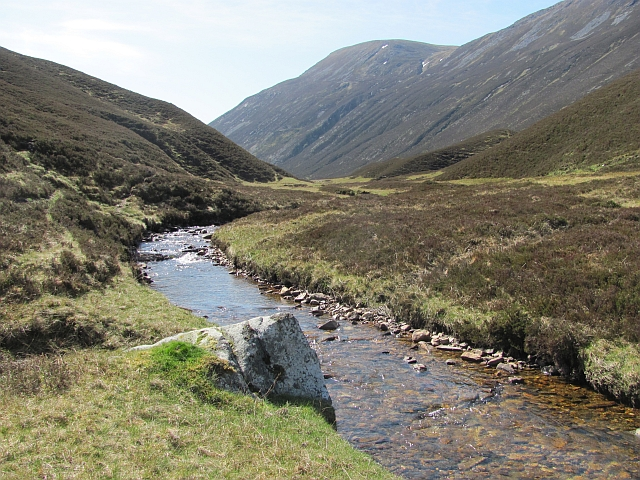
An Lochain in Glen Tilt

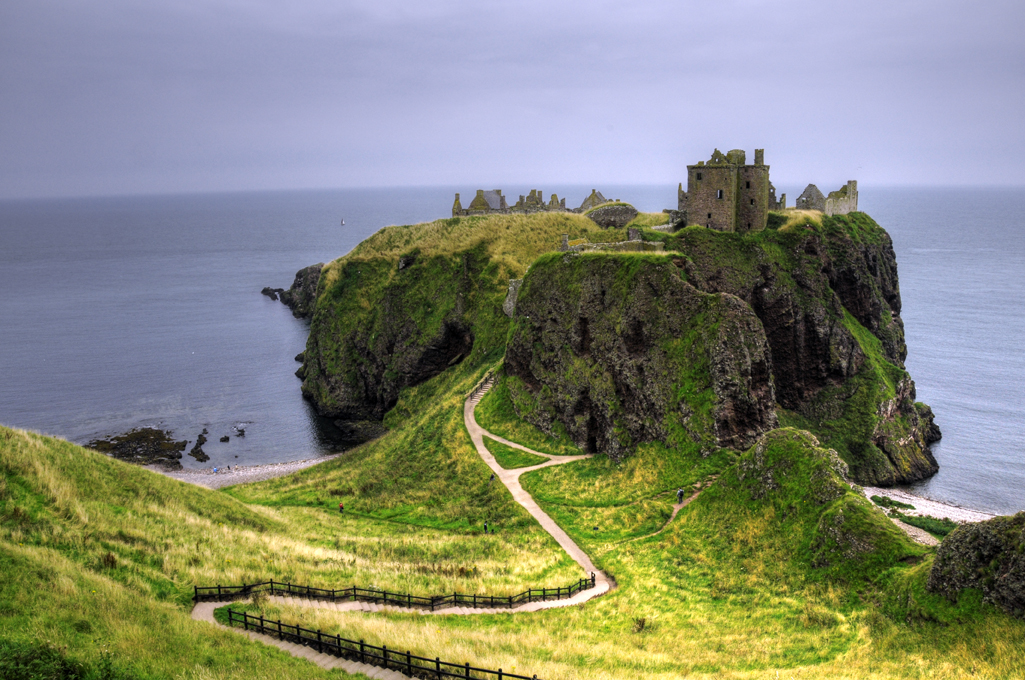
Mary came to Dunnottar on 5 November 1562 and 5 September 1564

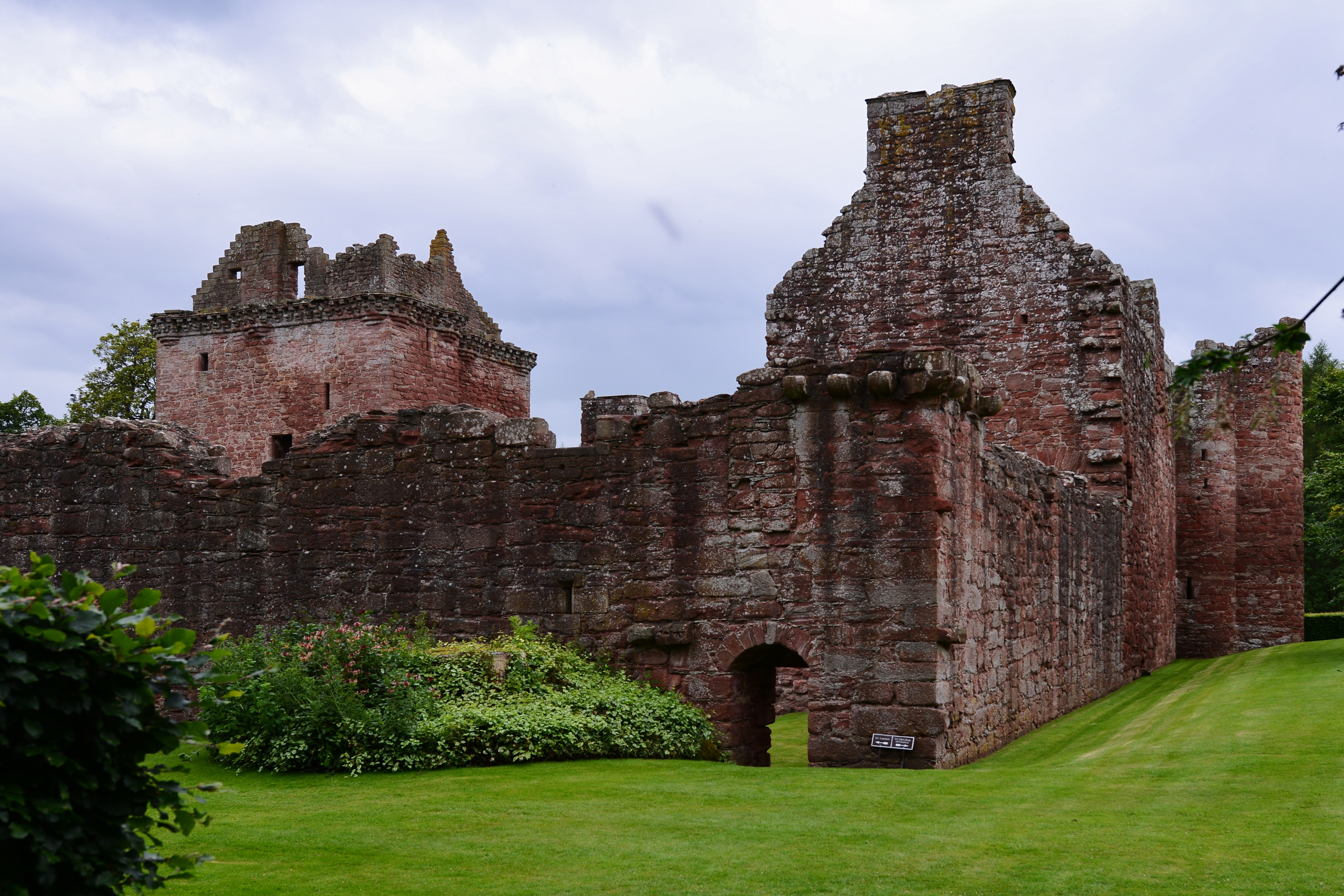
Mary's host at Edzell Castle was Katherine Campbell, Countess of Crawford.

Mary started her northern progress in August 1564 with a three day hunting trip in Glen Tilt hosted by the Earl of Atholl. She wrote two letters from "Lunkartis", probably a location beside the river An Lochain, and the word seems to be related to longphort, a Gaelic word that can mean a hunting lodge. The deer would be driven to a position where Mary would be able to release her hounds. According to an account of the hunt written by William Barclay, Mary released a dog to kill a wolf that appeared ahead of the deer. As well as hunting, Mary was also able to hear local issues concerning Colin Campbell of Glenorchy and disputes with the Macdonalds and MacGregors.

Mary's day to day movements in this journey are less well documented. George Buchanan mistakenly wrote that Mary hunted in Atholl at the end of the summer of 1563 rather than 1564 and did not describe the rest of the 1564 progress. The progress was noted by the English historian Raphael Holinshed.

After the hunt in Atholl, Mary travelled to Badenoch and Ruthven Castle (where some repairs had been made, and Mary ate roast lamb), and then to Inverness, the Chanonry of Ross, and Dingwall. The quartermaster of the Queen's archers, Allan Stewart, was paid for expenses "during the tyme of the quenis grace passing fra Edinburgh to Atholl to the huntis to Inverness and throuch the north cuntrie and to hir grace cumming agane to Edinburgh".

At a meeting of the Privy Council at Inverness on 11 August, the management of woodlands in Scotland was discussed. Letters were sent to towns in the north forbidding the buying and selling of tree bark. Oak, birch, and alder trees could be stripped for tanbark used for tanning leather.

Mary was at Gartly on 24 August and wrote to Elizabeth I for a safe conduct for a young courtier James Murray of Tullibardine. As Mary planned her return from Inverness a messenger boy was sent "to my lord Forbes, the lairds of Boquhane and Drum, erle Merschell, and the comptas of Craufurde to mak provisioun for the queinis majesties cumming fra Innerness". The record suggests another visit to Balquhain (Boquhane), and a visit to Drum Castle, the Earl Marischal's Dunnotar, and another visit to Edzell, before arriving at Dundee on 9 September. According to tradition, she first visited Banchory near Aberdeen and held a music competition, giving a harp to a local girl Beatrix Gardyn of Banchory.

When Mary returned to Edinburgh, she sent James Melville of Halhill as her envoy to Elizabeth I, instructing him to say that she had not received any letters during "our progress towards the northernmost parts of our realm these two months".

== Other progresses ==
- September 1561 – Linlithgow, Stirling Castle (where her bed caught fire), a castle of the Earl of Rothes (16 September), Perth (where she received a heart full of gold coins), Dundee, St Andrews, Falkland Palace.
- January and February 1565 – Fife including Falkland Palace (21 January), Collairnie Castle (24 January), and Wemyss Castle (16 February).
- June and July 1565 – Ruthven Castle (25 June), Dunkeld, Perth, and Callendar House (1 July).
- August and September 1565 – Chaseabout Raid; Kilsyth and Glasgow
- October 1565 – Edinburgh to Dumfries (11 October), Lochmaben Castle (14 October), Peebles (17 October).
- August and September 1566 – Hunting at Meggetland (Cramalt Tower) and Glen Finglas.
- October and November 1566 – Jedburgh, Hermitage Castle, Halidon Hill, Dunbar Castle.

James VI made plans for his first progress in May 1580. He wrote to William Douglas of Lochleven that he intended to go Tullibardine Castle to become "acquentit with the countrie".

== In fiction ==
Mrs Hubert Barclay wrote The Queen's Cause in 1938, a fictional narrative of Mary's reign based around the Clan Barclay of Gartly Castle. She describes Mary's arrival and stay at "Gartley" in August 1564 with her ladies and James Ogilvie of Cardell, the territorial rival of the executed John Gordon. The historical incident of Mary drafting a letter for James Murray is included. Nigel Tranter's 1953 novel The Queen's Grace follows the first northern progress and its impact on Patrick Gordon, a young laird, culminating in the battle of Corrichie.
