= Gartly =

Coordinates: 57.3787°N 2.7974°W

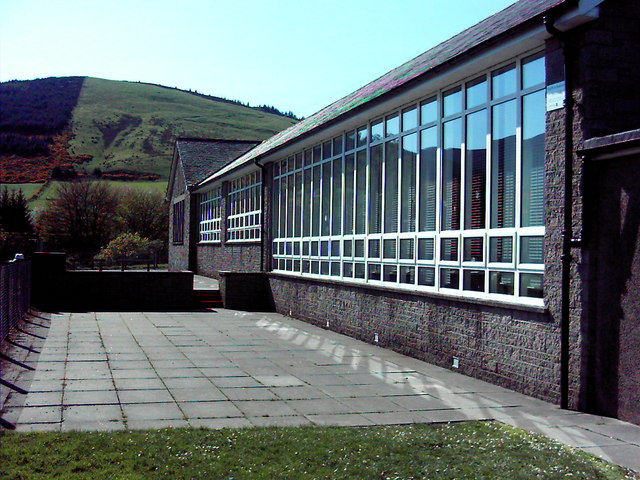
- Gartly School

- Location within Aberdeenshire
- Council area: Aberdeenshire
- Lieutenancy area: Aberdeenshire
- Country: Scotland
- Sovereign state: United Kingdom
- Police: Scotland
- Fire: Scottish
- Ambulance: Scottish
- UK Parliament: West Aberdeenshire and Kincardine
- Scottish Parliament: Aberdeenshire West

Gartly (Scots: Gairtlie, Scottish Gaelic: Gartaidh) is an inland hamlet in Aberdeenshire, Scotland. It is several miles south of the town of Huntly, and sits on the River Bogie, a tributary of the River Deveron. The parish in which it is located also takes its name.

== Education ==
Pupils are zoned to attend Gartly Primary School and The Gordon Schools in Huntly.

== History ==
Gartly Castle, visited by Mary, Queen of Scots prior to the Battle of Corrichie in 1562, lay south west of the village.

In June 1620 George Mitchell went to church at Gartly to hear the Sunday sermon. He was assaulted by three enemies who chased him out of the church, and he got into the flooded River Bogie to try to escape. His pursuers followed him into the water and drew their swords, injuring him in the face and elsewhere, before carrying him back to the Kirk of Gartly.

== Sources ==
- Gartly in the Gazetteer for Scotland.
