= James Murray (courtier) =

James Murray (died 1613) was a Scottish courtier as Master of the Wardrobe, and a keeper of the royal jewels from 1578 to 1583. English diplomats were unable to reinstate him in this influential role.

== Family background ==
During his career, James Murray was identified as a brother of William Murray, laird of Polmaise (died 1569), who married Agnes Cunningham, and in later years as the uncle or "father brother" of the laird John Murray. He was also known as "Mr James Murray". As a grandson of Robert Erskine, 4th Lord Erskine, he was a close relation to the Erskine family, including Margaret Erskine, mother of James Stewart, 1st Earl of Moray and Regent of Scotland.

Margaret Murray, his sister, married Adam Bothwell. His niece Jean or Janet Murray married James Sandilands, 1st Lord Torphichen (died 1579), the lawyer John Graham (died 1593), and thirdly the king's tutor Peter Young. John Murray, his nephew, became laird of Polmaise by 1581 and had a son called James Murray.

Another courtier, James Murray of Pardewis, a brother of William Murray of Tullibardine, was active in this period as an opponent of James Hepburn, 4th Earl of Bothwell. Another James Murray was a foreman and master cook in the royal kitchen, while James Murray, a carpenter and gunner at Edinburgh Castle, was the father of the architect James Murray of Kilbaberton. Another of the king's servants called James Murray may have been his great nephew.

== Career ==
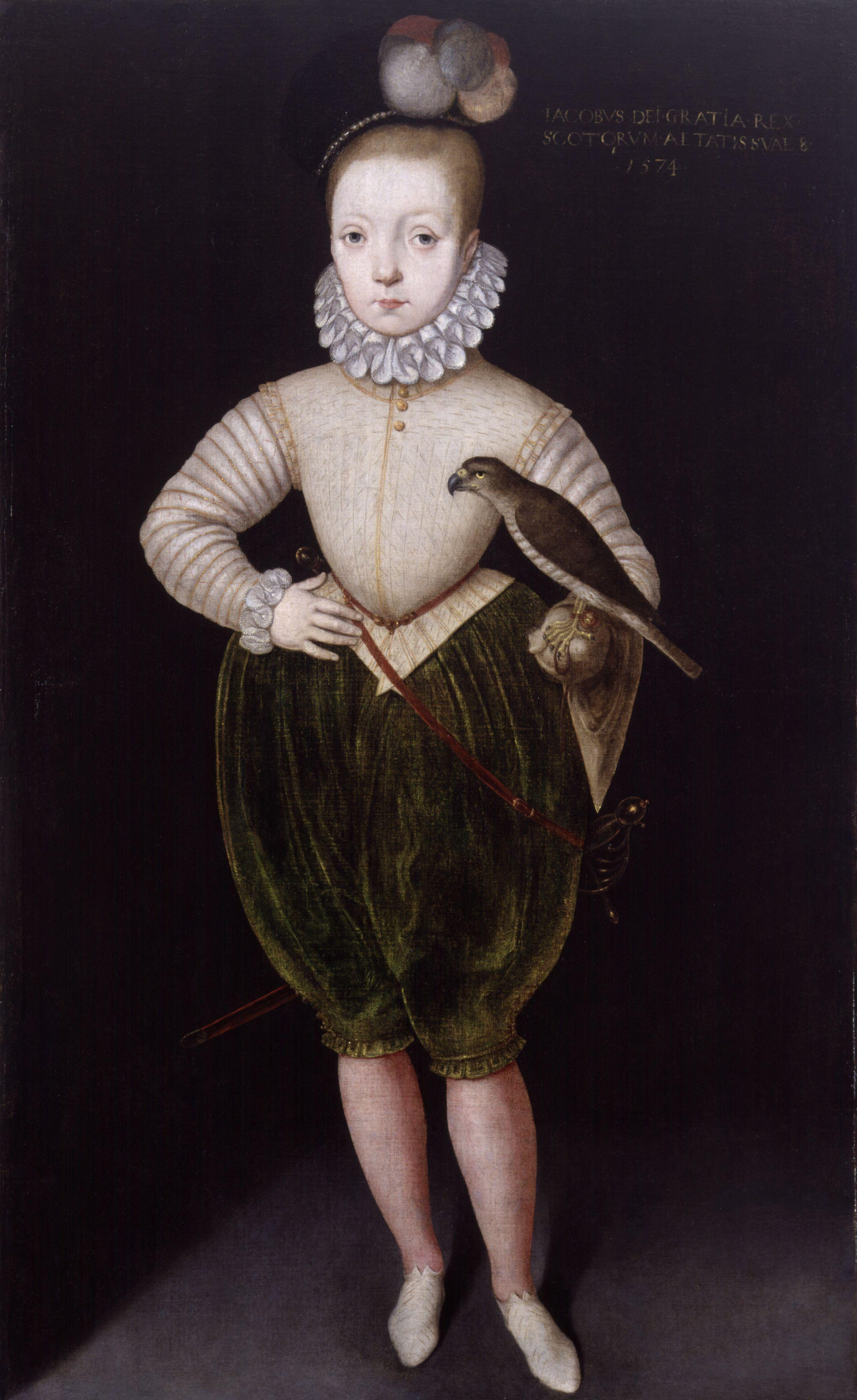
James VI and I, after Arnold Bronckorst

James Murray had a role in connection with the clothes and furs of the Earl of Moray. After the battle of Corrichie in 1562, James Murray, described as a "gentleman to the earl of Moray", was in charge of confiscated tapestries and furnishings shipped from Huntly Castle to Edinburgh. Some items were later used to furnish the lodging for Lord Darnley at the Kirk o' Field.

He is mentioned in inventories of the clothing, jewels, and books of Mary, Queen of Scots, made with John Wood after her abdication in 1567. Murray took receipt of vestments, painted cloths, and some masque costume, possibly for a Christmastime performance. According to William Kirkcaldy of Grange, Murray had keys to the coffer of Mary's jewels in Edinburgh Castle.

After Regent Moray was assassinated in January 1570, the Regency council summoned Moray's widow Agnes Keith and James Murray to produce jewels in their keeping. His niece Janet Murray and her husband James Sandilands, Lord Torphichen, were questioned about royal furnishings thought to be in their possession.

The English diplomat Thomas Randolph put in a good word for James Murray with Regent Morton in April 1575, as Murray was suffering under the Regent's "heavy displeasure". Murray was at the English court in June, Elizabeth I and Francis Walsingham wrote to Morton with their good opinions of him.

"James Murray of Pomais" presented a Greek New Testament to the royal library in April 1577, and his niece Janet Murray, as "Lady Torphichen", gave a copy of Jean Maugin's Le Parangon de Virtu (Lyon, 1556). She may have been a long-term friend of the king's tutor Peter Young and eventually married him. In 1573, her husband, James Sandilands, had delivered books which had belonged to Queen Mary to Peter Young.

=== Master of the Wardrobe ===
In 1578, James Murray was appointed Master of the Wardrobe to James VI. He helped make an inventory of jewels in February 1578 at Holyrood Palace and was present with his niece's husband John Graham when the coffer containing the remainder of the jewels of Mary, Queen of Scots, was sealed and returned to Edinburgh Castle to be held in the keeping of his kinsman Alexander Erskine of Gogar.

He also went twice to the court of Elizabeth I as a diplomat. His mission with the Abbot of Dunfermline concerned border administration, the death of George Forster, assurances of support in any future crisis, and an appeal for money to help James VI rule. To help fund his journey to London in July 1579, money was borrowed from his kinsman the Laird of Lochleven by George Douglas of Helenhill. Murray also received £666 Scots from the treasurer for his expenses.

Murray took receipt of royal jewels and costume from Annabell Murray, Countess of Mar at Stirling Castle including gold buttons and jewels to be sewn on a cloak. One of Mary's jewelled "back garnishings" was earmarked to be broken up for jewels to set on the king's clothes. Murray bought elaborate clothing including satin doublets for the young king, and costumes for his musicians, the English Hudson brothers. These purchases for Christmastide 1579 may include items for staging The Navigatioun and The Cartell of the Thre Ventrous Knights by Alexander Montgomerie.

=== Lennox and the royal wardrobe ===
In October 1580, John Forster reported potential changes at the Scottish court, due to the new favourite Esmé Stewart, 1st Duke of Lennox. He heard that John Stewart of Traquair would become Comptroller of Scotland and his brother William Stewart would be Master of the Wardrobe in Murray's place.

James VI gave Murray a property and income confiscated from Robert Hamilton of Dalserf. Another courtier, Sir John Carmichael, claimed the king had already given him this reward. The Privy Council decided in Murray's favour in January 1581. On 12 August 1581, James VI appointed his favourite Esmé Stewart, Duke of Lennox, as keeper of the wardrobe.

The Parliament of Scotland made a sumptuary law in November 1581, an act against the excess of "coistlie cleithing" which intended to prevent those of "mean estate" counterfeiting the courtly fashion for gold embroidery and imported luxury fabrics. Banqueting with imported confections was similarly proscribed and these measures were intended to promote manufacture at home. At court however, Lennox promoted French fashions. Murray seems to have continued in his role in the royal wardrobe, and with Elizabeth Stewart, Countess of Arran, he witnessed the handover of a selection of royal jewels including the Great H of Scotland to Esmé Stewart in October 1581.

=== A button for Lennox ===
In June 1583, the English ambassador in Paris, Henry Cobham, noted that the king's "pleasant servant" Murray had been sent to France with a gold button from the king's doublet, worn next to his heart, as a gift for Lennox. James VI had given Murray the button in secret at the royal kennels in the weeks before the end of the Gowrie Regime. Cobham heard that Murray had lost the button at Doncaster and had a replacement made in London.

=== A pawned jewel ===
Murray was mentioned in the documentation of an emerald and diamond jewel subsequently pledged by James VI to the burgh council of Edinburgh for a loan in April 1584. The jewel, after a series of paper transactions, was upgraded and refashioned by the goldsmith David Gilbert and presented to Anne of Denmark during her Entry to Edinburgh in May 1590.

== Sacked ==
In September 1580, the English diplomat Robert Bowes recognised that although Murray and the four masters of the royal stable had the king's ear and were able to defeat plots against him, he was vulnerable to faction as a "depender of the House of Mar". Murray lost his position at the fall of the Gowrie Regime in August 1583. It seems that he favoured alliance with England and was said to have a pension paid by Queen Elizabeth.

A paper for reform of the household made in May 1584 includes his appointment as Master of the Wardrobe for the whole year. In October 1584, the new Master of the Wardrobe, Patrick, Master of Gray, took charge of jewels that had been in Murray's keeping, including a piece with three diamonds and three rubies in a gold setting enamelled with white, red, and black.

In December 1585, the Parliament of Scotland upheld Murray and his sister-in-law Agnes Cunningham, Lady Polmaise, in a dispute over the lands of Polmaise. John Cunningham of Drumquhassle, who had been executed as a rebel in February, had previously asserted a claim to her lands.

In October 1589, he wrote a letter to his English allies, hoping they could use their diplomatic influence to reinstate him as Master of the Wardrobe instead of William Keith of Delny. Delny was sacked at this time, but his replacement was George Home, later Earl of Dunbar.

Murray tried again in May 1590, hoping the English ambassador Edward Somerset, 4th Earl of Worcester would speak to James VI on his behalf. This attempt seemed to founder because James VI thought that the Earl of Worcester spoke up for Murray at the suggestion of some people he had met in Edinburgh, rather than by the wishes of Queen Elizabeth. The diplomat Robert Bowes hoped that the Scottish courtier Sir John Carmichael (and Murray's rival for a gift in 1580) might be able to explain the origin of the "motion" to King James. Murray, however, was not reinstated.

Murray's employment at the Scottish court resurfaced in Bowes's letters, and in June 1593 he advised that Queen Elizabeth might recommend Murray to Scottish diplomat Robert Melville.

== Suspected ==
With other Stirlingshire landowners he signed the February 1594 band for keeping Prince Henry at Stirling Castle. Soon after, he was arrested as a follower of the rebel Francis Stewart, 5th Earl of Bothwell. He was questioned by Thomas Lyon, Master of Glamis and was held for time in Edinburgh in John Robertson's house. Robertson was an old wardrobe colleague who had supplied clothes for king's pages in 1582. Robert Bowes noted the arrest of "James Murray, brother of John Murray" and others in April. A poor man who had taken an advance of money from Bothwell was hanged.

It was planned that Thomas Parry or the Earl of Sussex would speak to James VI for his reinstatement at the baptism of Prince Henry in August 1594. Murray wrote a letter with news from Scotland, confident that the intercession would work. He thought the baptism would not be as magnificent as James hoped, and he had heard of a plot against Anne of Denmark and the Duke of Lennox.

== Hallyards at Torphichen ==
John Graham, the husband of Janet Murray, was killed in 1593 by James Sandilands of Slamannan in a feud concerning the lands of Hallyards at Kirkliston in the parish of Torphichen. When Janet Murray died in 1597, James Murray became involved in a new dispute with James Sandilands and James Sandilands of Calder over the lands of Hallyards and Hallbarns and the Mains of Liston. Janet Murray had inherited a portion of these lands from her father, John Murray of Polmaise, who was the older brother of James Murray.

James Murray obtained a kind of injunction preventing Sandilands's tenants from mowing the meadows. Sandilands successfully claimed that Murray's letters were invalid, having been informed by "sinister information", and that Jean Murray only had lifetime rights to the meadows. James Murray's connection to the estate was complex. He had himself obtained lands at Hallyards which had previously been given to John Seton of Barnes, but this gift had been revoked in August 1584 and given to John Graham.

== Later life, and death ==
James Murray, or his nephew's son, was described as the king's domestic servant on 5 April 1603, when James VI sent him to summon Robert Bruce of Kinnaird to him at Holyrood Palace before he left for England.

A portrait of "James Murray" dated 1610, formerly at Polmaise Castle, may depict the former master of the wardrobe. James Murray died in 1613 at Stirling. His will includes a number of items of costume.
