= Elizabeth Keith, Countess of Huntly =

Scottish noblewoman (fl. 1530–1566)

Personal details
- Born: Unknown Dunnottar Castle, Aberdeenshire, Scotland
- Died: Unknown
- Spouse: George Gordon, 4th Earl of Huntly
- Children: 12, including George, Jean, James, Adam, and Patrick
- Parent(s): Robert Keith, Master of Marischal; Lady Elizabeth Douglas

Elizabeth Keith, Countess of Huntly (fl. 1530-1566), was a Scottish noblewoman and the wife of George Gordon, 4th Earl of Huntly, Scotland's leading Catholic magnate during the reign of Mary, Queen of Scots. In 1562, Elizabeth encouraged her husband to raise forces against Queen Mary which led to his being outlawed, and after his death, his titles forfeited to the Crown. Elizabeth's son Sir John Gordon was executed for having taken part in his father's rebellion.

She succeeded to the title of Countess of Huntly at her marriage on 27 March 1530, but like all Scottish married women in the sixteenth century would never have used her husband's surname. Her daughter, Lady Jean Gordon, Countess of Bothwell was the first wife of James Hepburn, 4th Earl of Bothwell, third husband of Mary, Queen of Scots.

== Family ==
Elizabeth was born on an unknown day in 1513,[reference needed] in Dunnottar Castle, Aberdeenshire, Scotland, the eldest daughter of Robert Keith, Master of Marischal and Lady Elizabeth Douglas. Her paternal grandparents were William Keith, 3rd Earl Marischal and Elizabeth Gordon, and her maternal grandparents were John Douglas, 2nd Earl of Morton and Janet Crichton. Her brother was William Keith, 4th Earl Marischal (died 7 October 1581).

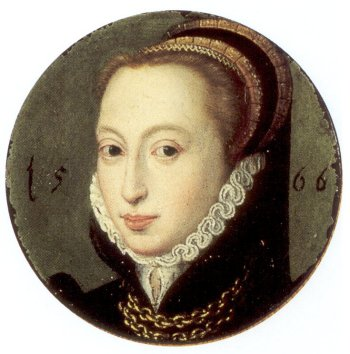
Portrait of Lady Jean Gordon, Countess of Bothwell, daughter of Elizabeth Gordon. She was the first wife of James Hepburn, Earl of Bothwell

== Marriage and children ==
On 27 March 1530, Elizabeth married George Gordon, 4th Earl of Huntly, the wealthiest and most powerful landowner in the Scottish Highlands, whose estates approached those of an independent monarch. He was also the leading Catholic magnate in Scotland. Her brother promised to give Elizabeth five thousands merks as a tocher. Upon her marriage, Elizabeth became the Countess of Huntly. Their main residence was Strathbogie Castle in the Scottish Highlands. The Earl became Lord Chancellor of Scotland in 1546 following the death of David Beaton, Archbishop of St. Andrews. He was taken prisoner at the battle of Pinkie on 10 September 1547 and Elizabeth came with him to Berwick-upon-Tweed, returning to Scotland at the end of the month.

He and Elizabeth together had a total of 12 children:

- Thomas Gordon, married Jean Gordon, daughter of John Gordon, 11th Earl of Sutherland and Elizabeth Campbell, widow of James Stewart, 1st Earl of Moray.
- George Gordon, 5th Earl of Huntly, Lord Chancellor of Scotland (died 19 October 1576), on 12 March 1558 married Lady Anne Hamilton, daughter of James Hamilton, Duke of Châtellerault and Lady Margaret Douglas, by whom he had issue.
- Lady Margaret Gordon, married John Forbes, 8th Lord Forbes, by whom she had issue.
- Lady Jean Gordon (1546 – 14 May 1629), married firstly on 24 February 1566, James Hepburn, 4th Earl of Bothwell, whom she divorced on 3 May 1567; secondly on 13 December 1573, Alexander Gordon, 12th Earl of Sutherland, by whom she had issue; and thirdly in December 1599 Alexander Ogilvy of Boyne.
- Lady Elizabeth Gordon, married John Stewart, 4th Earl of Atholl, by whom she had two daughters.
- Alexander, Lord Gordon (died 18 September 1552/11 August 1553), married Barbara Hamilton, daughter of Regent Arran, the marriage was childless.
- Sir John Gordon, (executed 2 November 1562), married the widow of the Laird of Findlater
- William Gordon (died in Paris)
- James Gordon (died 1620 in Paris)
- Sir Adam Gordon of Auchindoun (b. 1546 died 1580)
- Sir Patrick Gordon of Auchindoun (killed in 1594 at the battle of Glenlivet)
- Robert Gordon

== Huntly's rebellion ==
Elizabeth was described as having made all the decisions for her husband, and often "turned to the aid of her familiars and witches when inspiration from any other source was lacking". She was better educated and her writing was superior to that of the Earl. She also was surrounded by a large and splendid train of personal attendants. On 23 August 1550, she ordered the execution of William Mackintosh for having committed treason against Huntly who was accompanying the Scottish Regent Marie of Guise to her native France.

In 1562, after her husband's title of Earl of Moray was taken from him and granted to Lord James Stewart, the illegitimate half-brother of Mary, Queen of Scots and husband of Elizabeth's niece Lady Agnes Keith the Earl of Huntly rebelled and raised a force of his own retainers against Queen Mary. Elizabeth encouraged her husband in his rebellion, and persuaded him to attack the queen's troops at Aberdeen and there apprehend Queen Mary. with the purpose of forcing her into marriage with their son, Sir John.

Mary, Queen of Scots came to Inverness and decided to take Huntly Castle, giving as a cause that the Earl withheld from her a royal cannon lent to him by Regent Arran. Huntly and his wife ordered the cannon to be dismantled and hidden in a cellar. Elizabeth, Countess of Huntly received the queen's messenger Captain Hay on 25 October 1562. She showed him the castle chapel furnished for Roman Catholic worship, intending to gain the queen's sympathy. Queen Mary was not convinced by this, and she sent her half-brother John Stewart, Commendator of Coldingham to arrest the Earl of Huntly and take Huntly Castle. William Kirkcaldy of Grange and the Tutor of Pitcur arrived first and surrounded the house. While Kirkcaldy was talking to the castle porter, the castle watchman on the tower spotted Coldingham and the Master of Lindsay and their troops a mile off. He alerted the Earl, who ran without "boot or sword" and hopped over a low wall at the back of the castle and found a horse before Pitcur could stop him. The Earl and a small number of followers evaded capture, and went to Bog o'Gight, now called Gordon Castle. The Countess then welcomed the queen's men in and gave them a meal and showed them around the place. Most of the furnishings had been taken away, except the chapel things and "a few beds of the worst sort".

A few days after on 20 October, the Countess of Huntly came Aberdeen to see Queen Mary, but she was sent back to Huntly. Huntly assembled an army of 700 men and marched towards Aberdeen. On 28 October, at the Battle of Corrichie, Huntly and his men were defeated by Queen Mary's army led by James Stewart, Earl of Moray. Huntly died of apoplexy on the battlefield, while Elizabeth's sons John and Adam, themselves having actively participated in the rebellion and battle, were captured and shortly afterwards on 2 November, Sir John was executed by the orders of Queen Mary for treason. The life of seventeen-year-old Adam was spared as was that of George, Lord Gordon who had denied the queen entrance to the castle of Inverness where he held the post of sheriff; George, although pardoned, was nonetheless ordered to Kinneil House and then Dunbar Castle where he remained in custody until 1565 when his dignities were nominally restored to him. In 1563, the year following the Battle of Corrichie, Huntly's title and possessions were forfeited to the crown at a macabre session of Parliament with Queen Mary in attendance, in which his embalmed corpse was set up for all to see, and was pronounced guilty of treason and the sentence of forfeiture passed upon it.

Huntly Castle was stripped of its furnishings after the battle of Corrichie and these were shipped from Inverness to the queen's palace of Holyrood and to the Earl of Moray's castle of Darnaway. Among the confiscated belongings were elaborate tapestries, velvet-covered beds, hung with fringes of gold and silverwork, figures of animals, and vessels of gilded and coloured glass. The treasures were itemised in inventories by Mary's servant Servais de Condé, who also recorded the alteration of the beds in the royal wardrobe. Several items from Huntly were taken to furnish the Kirk o'Field lodging in 1567 and lost in the explosion at the murder of Lord Darnley.

Later, as a token of the queen's clemency towards the Huntlys, Elizabeth and her second eldest daughter, Jean, were given positions at the royal court.

On 24 February 1566, Jean became the first wife of James Hepburn, Earl of Bothwell who, following his divorce from Jean in 1567, would marry as her third husband, Mary, Queen of Scots.

In March 1566, Elizabeth, who had by that time become a loyal adherent of Queen Mary, spent the night tending the queen, who was in her sixth month of pregnancy, at Holyrood Palace following the murder of David Rizzio. She devised various plans for Mary's escape which the latter rejected as having been impracticable. She finally managed to smuggle a letter to her son George, who also had become Mary's partisan, ordering him to stand by at Seton with a party of nobles to aid the queen on her journey to Dunbar Castle after she successfully escaped from the palace.

Elizabeth Gordon died on an unknown date.
