= Auchindoun Castle =

Castle in Auchindoun near Dufftown in Moray, Scotland

Coordinates: 57°25′22.17″N 3°05′8.3286″W

Auchindoun Castle is a 15th-century L-Plan tower castle located in Auchindoun near Dufftown in Moray, Scotland.

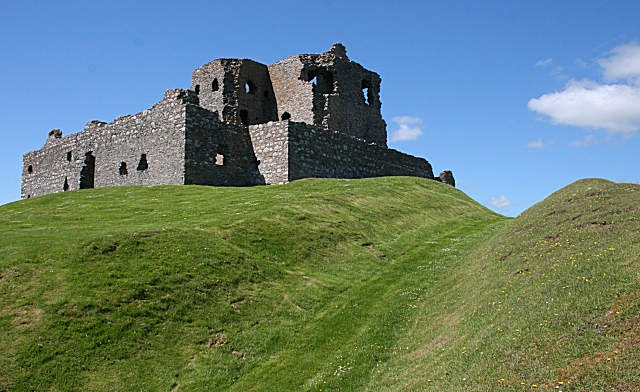
Auchindoun Castle

== History ==
While there is evidence of prehistoric or Pictish earthworks in the grounds of the castle, the remains most visible today are of the castle constructed in the mid-15th century. This building is sometimes said to be the work of Robert Cochrane, a favourite of James III. It passed to the Clan Ogilvy in 1489 and from them to the Clan Gordon in 1535.

There are accounts, including by William Forbes Skene and Alexander Macbain, that state that William Mackintosh, 15th of Mackintosh had burned the Earl of Huntly's Auchindoun Castle which is why Huntly had him executed in 1550. However, Alexander Mackintosh-Shaw states that this story is entirely fictitious.

In September 1562, Mary, Queen of Scots, ordered John Gordon to surrender Auchindoun and Findlater. Gordon was executed after the battle of Corrichie. By an arbitration in July 1564, between Elizabeth Gordon and her stepson James Ogilvie of Cardell, she was allowed a liferent interest in Auchindoun Castle. The castle was damaged by the Clan Mackintosh in 1592 in retaliation for Huntly's killing of the Bonny Earl O'Moray, their ally. In March 1593 Patrick Gordon of Auchindoun was forfeited as a rebel, and Auchindoun Castle was given to Sir George Home, whose wife Elizabeth Gordon was Patrick Gordon's stepdaughter.

After the battle of Glenlivet in October 1594, the wounded followers of the Earl of Huntly came to Auchindoun for safety. James VI ordered that Auchindoun, Slains Castle, Huntly Castle, and the Gordon castles of Abergeldy and Newton should be slighted or demolished.

Following the Restoration of Charles II, the castle was again awarded to the Marquis of Huntly.

In 1689, during the first Jacobite rising, the castle was used as a temporary headquarters (on 6–7 June 1689) by John Graham, 1st Viscount Dundee and his Jacobite army. However, the castle was derelict by 1725. Stones taken from the castle were used in local farm buildings and nearby Balvenie Castle.

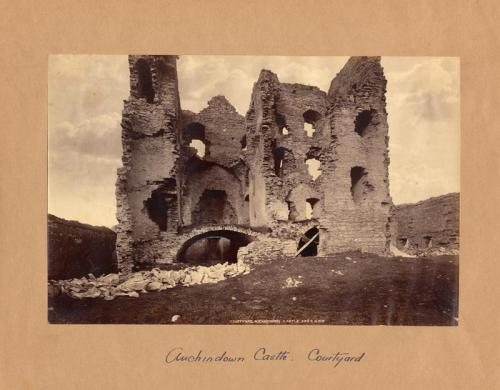
Courtyard Auchindown Castle - Photographic print

== Architecture ==
While standing, the castle had a large central tower and high curtain wall. Supporting buildings including a stable, brewery and bakery stood inside the wall. A second round tower guarded the north-west corner of the compound. Cellars and possibly dungeons were dug directly into the bedrock beneath the tower. Today much of the curtain wall and some of the outbuildings remain, but the central tower itself is very dilapidated.

An extension is known to have been added in the 16th century by the Gordons before the Ogilvys reclaimed it in 1594. Stones taken from the castle have been used in local farm buildings and nearby Balvenie Castle.

The ruins of the castle are in the care of Historic Environment Scotland as a scheduled monument, but were for many years in too dangerous a condition to be open to the public. On the completion of consolidation works, Auchindoun was reopened for public viewing in November 2007.

== "The Burning of Auchindoun" song ==
The sacking of Auchindoun by the Clan Mackintosh inspired a traditional song, "The Burning of Auchindoun" (lyrics courtesy of the Digital Tradition Folk Music Database), Child Ballad 183, "Willie MacIntosh":

As A cam in by Fiddichside, on a May mornin
A spied Willie MacIntosh an oor before the dawnin

Tarn again, tarn again, tarn again, A'se bid ye
If ye barn Auchindoun, Huntly he will heid ye

Heid me or hang me, that shall never fear me
A'll burn Auchindoun tho' the life leave me

As A cam in bi Fiddichside on a May mornin
Auchindoun was in a bleeze, an oor before the dawnin

Crawing, crawing, for a' your crouse crawin'
Ye burnt yer crop an tint your wings an oor before the dawnin

== Gallery ==
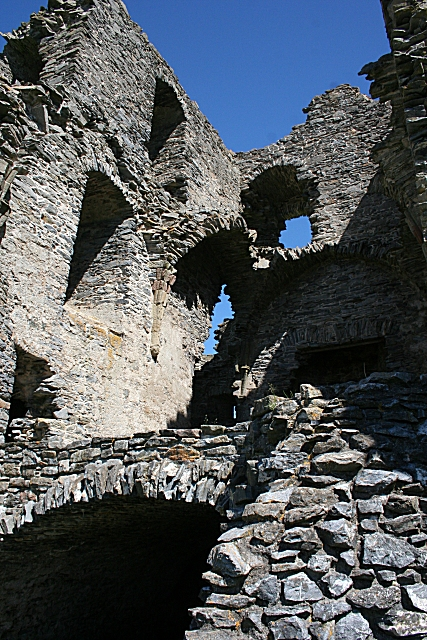
Arches and vaults of Auchindoun Castle Keep

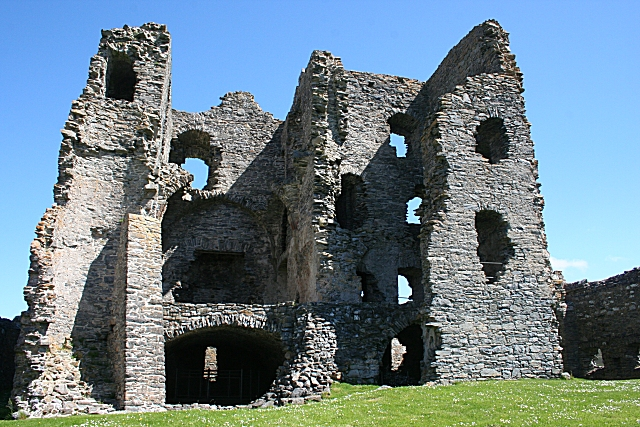
Auchindoun Castle Keep

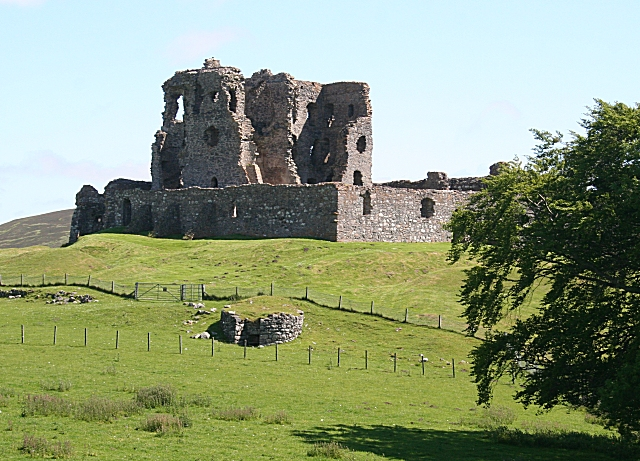
Auchindoun Castle with Kiln visible

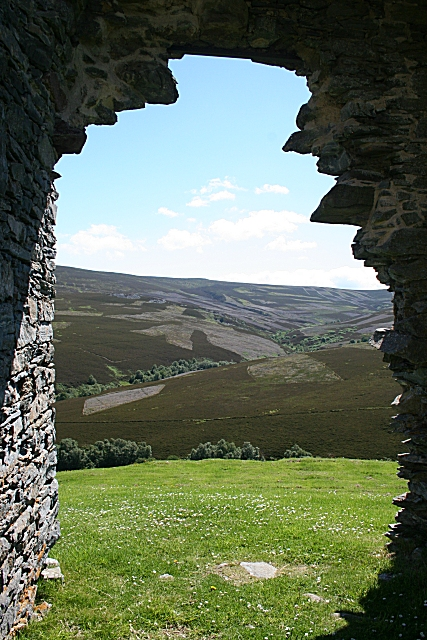
View from the Castle through a ruined doorway, towards the South East

== See also ==
- List of places in Moray
- List of places in Highland
- List of places in Aberdeenshire
- Scheduled monuments in Moray
