= Patrick Gordon of Auchindoun =

Scottish landowner & rebel (1538–1594)

Patrick Gordon
- Born: 1538
- Died: 5 October 1594 (aged 55–56); Battle of Glenlivet
- Occupations: Landowner and rebel
- Spouses: Janet Leslie; Agnes Beaton
- Parent(s): George Gordon, 4th Earl of Huntly; Elizabeth Keith

Patrick Gordon of Auchindoun (1538–1594) was a Scottish landowner and rebel. He was a son of George Gordon, 4th Earl of Huntly and Elizabeth Keith, a daughter of Robert Keith, Master of Marischal, who was killed at the battle of Flodden. His home was Auchindoun Castle, which he possessed in succession to his brother, Adam Gordon of Auchindoun, who died unexpectedly in Edinburgh in 1581 at the age of 35. He assumed responsibility for the administration of the Gordons' Aberdeenshire estates during the minority of the 6th Earl.

Patrick Gordon's first wife was Janet Leslie. He married secondly, by July 1583, Agnes Beaton, a daughter of Cardinal David Beaton, Archbishop of St. Andrews, and Marion Ogilvy, to whom he gifted Gartlie or Haltoun Castle in Banff, also known as Barclay.'

In 1586, Lord Gordon sent Patrick Gordon north to try to prevent another outbreak of conflict between Alexander Gordon, 12th Earl of Sutherland and George Sinclair, 5th Earl of Caithness. A meeting between the two Earls was arranged at which it was agreed that they would instead take joint action against Clan Gunn. Patrick was later a member of the combined Caithness and Sutherland force that caught up with and defeated the men of Clan Gunn at Leckmelm, as they attempted to retreat to the Western Isles.

In April 1589 Patrick was with members of the Gordon family and others who assembled against James VI, King of Scots, at the Bridge of Dee. John Colville wrote that Auchindoun and other lairds were "obstinate" and not likely to willingly enter the king's peace.

His wife Agnes Beaton came to court to plead on his behalf in June 1590, and made a favorable impression by bringing her daughter, Elizabeth Gordon, the heiress of Gight. An influential courtier, Sir George Home was interested in marrying Elizabeth Gordon. She joined the household of Anne of Denmark. Lady Auchindoun also promised that her husband would produce a copy of the league made at the Bridge of Dee. Auchindoun stayed at Niddry Castle in West Lothian as the guest of Lord Seton in July 1590, hoping to regain royal favour, while his wife was again at court. He got an audience with the king and gave him a copy of a band or league made at the Bridge of Dee in April 1589. The Earl of Huntly had thrown the copy on a fire, and then retrieved it.

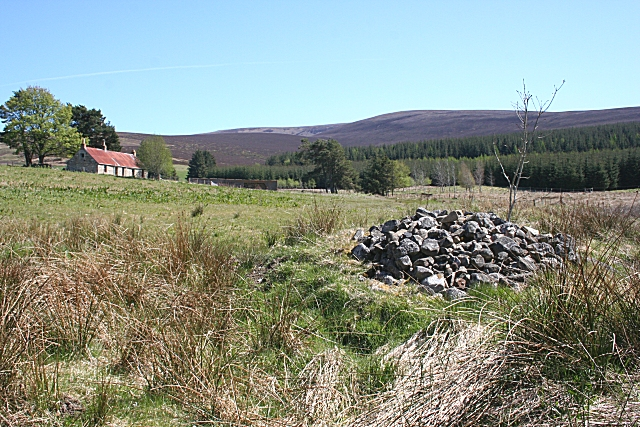
Lord Auchindoun's cairn is said to mark the spot where Sir Patrick died from wounds received at the battle of Glenlivet

In March 1593 Patrick Gordon of Auchindoun was forfeited as a rebel, and Auchindoun Castle regarded as his wife's jointure, was given to Sir George Home, whose wife Elizabeth Gordon was Patrick Gordon's stepdaughter. In September 1593 the Synod of Fife took action against the Catholic Gordon family and others, excommunicating Auchindoun and the Earl of Huntly, to the king's displeasure.

In July 1594 there was talk of a compromise between the Catholic nobility in the north and the Scottish Kirk. Auchindoun said to Jean Gordon, Countess of Sutherland he would "wash his hands shortly in the heart-blood of some of the best of the ministers". The Countess drank a toast to him.

Gordon was killed at the battle of Glenlivet on 3 October 1594. He was shot down while charging with the Earl of Erroll at the Earl of Argyll's troops, and it was reported they stabbed him with dirks and cut off his head.
