= George Gordon, 5th Earl of Huntly =

Scottish nobleman (died 1576)

George Gordon
- 5th Earl of Huntly
- Tenure: 1565–1576
- Predecessor: George Gordon, 4th Earl of Huntly
- Successor: George Gordon, 6th Earl of Huntly
- Died: 19 October 1576; Strathbogie
- Offices: Sheriff of Inverness; Lord Chancellor of Scotland
- Spouse: Anne Hamilton
- Issue: Lady Jean Gordon; George Gordon, 6th Earl of Huntly; Alexander Gordon; William Gordon
- Parents: George Gordon, 4th Earl of Huntly; Elizabeth Keith
- Religion: Roman Catholicism

George Gordon, 5th Earl of Huntly (died 19 October 1576), was Lord Chancellor of Scotland and major conspirator of the Marian civil war.

== Biography ==
The second son of the 4th Earl, George Gordon was the Sheriff of Inverness from 1556. As Captain of Badenoch, he was in charge of carrying letters sent from Edinburgh to Mary of Guise in Inverness from Dunkeld throughout the summer of 1556. Mary, Queen of Scots came north to reduce the power of the Gordons and take Inverness Castle in 1562. The 4th Earl was captured at Corrichie with two of his sons, John and Adam Gordon, and died of apoplexy after his capture. John, the elder, was executed three days later. George (called Lord Gordon) was imprisoned at Kinneil House. He was attainted and sentenced to death for treason in 1563. He was then imprisoned at Dunbar castle until the marriage of Queen Mary to Darnley in 1565.

During the rebellion against Mary called the Chaseabout Raid, his titles were restored to ensure his loyalty to the queen. He was released on ward on 3 August 1565 with six cautioners offering a security of £10,000 Scots, and his titles were proclaimed at the Mercat Cross of Edinburgh on 25 August. The ward was formally ended on 17 April 1566, Huntly's cautioners were Lord Home, Lord Herries, John Gordon of Lochinvar, Alexander Stewart of Garleis, and James Cockburn of Skirling.

According to James Melville of Halhill, Huntly was at Holyrood Palace on 9 March 1566 when David Rizzio was murdered. He and James Hepburn, 4th Earl of Bothwell jumped out of a window into "the little garden where the lions are lodged". Huntly allied himself with James Hepburn, 4th Earl of Bothwell, who married his sister Jean on 24 February 1566. Huntly joined Queen Mary at Seton and at Dunbar after Rizzio's murder in 1566. He became Lord Chancellor of Scotland in 1567, and joined Bothwell in the plot to murder the Regent Moray at Jedburgh. He signed the bond at Craigmillar Castle for Darnley's murder, and accompanied Bothwell and Mary on the visit to Darnley before his murder.

His estates were fully restored after Bothwell's acquittal in 1567. Bothwell's divorce from his sister was facilitated by his influence over her, and he witnessed the marriage contract between Mary and Bothwell. He connived at the capture of the Queen, and accompanied her to Edinburgh, escaping to the north after her flight. He joined the partisans at Dumbarton Castle, and after a temporary agreement with Regent Moray he conspired for her deliverance from Lochleven Castle in 1567. After the Queen's escape to England in 1568, he held all the north in alliance with Argyll, but received Mary's order to disperse.

Huntly made an agreement with Regent Moray at St Andrews on 14 May 1569. Huntly was to make up his quarrel with the Earl of Morton, repress rebellion amongst his former allies, and surrender a royal cannon kept at Huntly Castle. In return, Regent Moray would give the Earl and his followers a remission for all their crimes against the King since 11 June 1567, and promised an Act of Parliament to forgive his role as 'pretended Lieutenant to the Queen's Grace' between August 1568 and March 1569.

After the assassination of Regent Moray by James Hamilton of Bothwellhaugh in January 1570, Huntly continued to act as the Queen's Lieutenant in the north, holding courts at Aberdeen which usurped the authority of James VI and his regents. As the Marian civil war continued, Huntly gained possession of Edinburgh Castle, held a parliament in Edinburgh, and captured Regent Lennox at Stirling. His brother Adam Gordon of Auchindoun was his lieutenant in the north, and fought for Queen Mary in Aberdeenshire and the Mearns.

On behalf of Queen Mary, Huntly had written in November 1570 to Agnes Keith, Countess of Moray about the royal jewel known as the Great H of Scotland. He made an inventory of the remaining royal jewels held in Edinburgh Castle on 28 August 1571 assisted by William Maitland of Lethington, Mary Fleming, James Balfour and Lady Seton. Huntly lent money to William Kirkcaldy of Grange who led the garrison at Edinburgh Castle. In return for his loans Kirkcaldy gave Huntly jewels as pledges. One piece, a gold garnishing for the queen's hair set with rubies, diamonds and pearls was returned to Regent Morton by Huntly's servant Alexander Drummond of Midhope in August 1573. Huntly signed receipts for these jewels which are kept in the National Archives of Scotland.

In 1572 the Earl came to terms with the Regent Morton. He spent a few days with Morton at Dalkeith Palace in June 1574.

He died at Strathbogie, four years later. An eyewitness description of his death, compiled by Richard Bannatyne, describes how he suffered a stroke, or a collapse caused by food-poisoning, while playing football. After the Earl died, a number of alleged supernatural events occurred, beginning with the sudden collapse of one of the servants. Three companions also collapsed and, when revived, complained of feeling cold. After the Earl's body was embalmed and taken to the chapel, his brother sat in the hall and heard unexplained sounds from the earl's chamber.

=== Family ===
He married Anne, daughter of James Hamilton, Duke of Châtellerault. Their children included:

- Jean Gordon, who married George Sinclair, 5th Earl of Caithness
- George Gordon, 6th Earl of Huntly
- Alexander Gordon (died January 1622), married Lady Agnes Sinclair.
- William Gordon, a monk.

== Sources ==
Peerage of Scotland
Preceded by George Gordon	Earl of Huntly; 1565–1576	Succeeded by George Gordon
Political offices
Preceded by 4th Earl of Morton	Lord Chancellor of Scotland; 1567–1567	Succeeded by 4th Earl of Morton
