= Drumin Castle =

Coordinates: 57.35633°N 3.357322°W

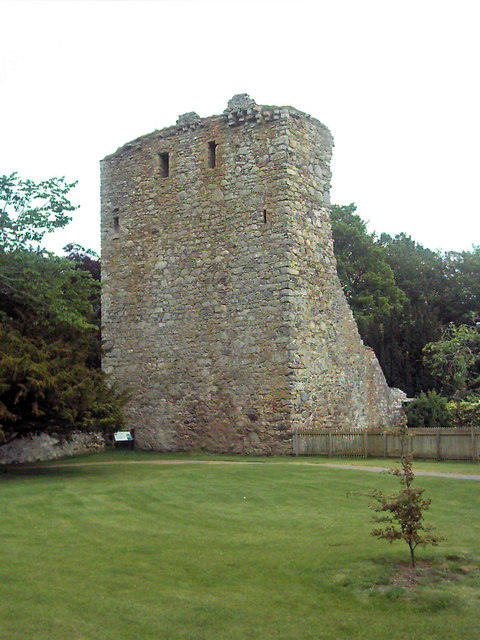
- Ruins of Drumin Castle

General information
- Location: Moray, Glenlivet, Scotland

Drumin or Drummin Castle is a ruined tower house near Glenlivet, Moray, Scotland. The castle is situated on a ridge above the junction of the Livet and Avon Rivers. It is a designated scheduled monument.

== History ==
The lands were granted by King Robert II to his son Alexander Stewart in the early 1370s. Drumin Castle passed from the Stewart family to the Gordon family in 1490.

Mary, Queen of Scots came to the north of Scotland on progress. The Earl of Huntly and the Gordon family were defeated at the battle of Corrichie. On 4 November, Mary ordered John Grant of Freuchie to take Drumin Castle, and he took possession on 3 December 1562.

The castle was abandoned in the 18th century and fell into disrepair.
