= James Murray of Pardewis =

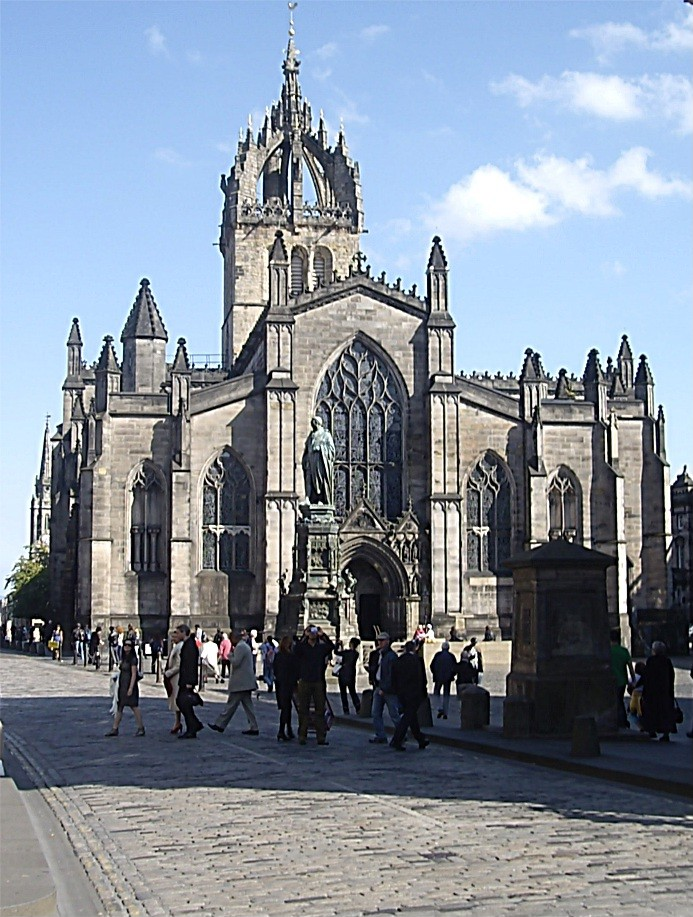
Protests and challenges were made by fixing papers to the door of St Giles and the adjacent tolbooth

John Murray of Pardewis (died 1592) was a Scottish courtier who opposed James Hepburn, 4th Earl of Bothwell in 1567, and fixed painted papers on the Tolbooth of Edinburgh criticising Mary, Queen of Scots.

== Family background ==
James Murray was the son of William Murray of Tullibardine (died 1562) and Katherine Campbell, daughter of Duncan Campbell of Glenorchy (died 1513) and Margaret Moncreiffe. His older brother William Murray of Tullibardine was Comptroller of Scotland. The main family residences were Tullibardine Castle and the Place of Gask. His sister Annabell Murray, Countess of Mar looked after James VI and I at Stirling Castle.

== Pardewis and Bothwell ==
Mary wrote to Elizabeth I for a safe conduct for James Murray to travel to England in August 1564, while she was at Gartly Castle on her second northern progress.

After the murder of Lord Darnley in February 1567, rumours spread that the Earl of Bothwell and some of the servants of Mary, Queen of Scots (including Bastian Pagez and Francisco de Busso) were to blame. According to the "Book of Articles", the townspeople of Edinburgh fixed "placards secretly in all public places namimg and declaring the murderers, chiefly Bothwell". In response, Bothwell was able to "trouble all painters and other suspects for working or affixing the said placards".

A sign with a mermaid and a hare was displayed on the door of the Tolbooth in Edinburgh and the door of St Giles Cathedral. On 14 March 1567, John Murray of Pardewis was charged with slandering the Queen by devising and setting up "painted papers" in Edinburgh. This was "open and manifest treason". He avoided capture by the Queen's authorities.

The chronicle of Robert Lindsay of Pitscottie says that Murray was summoned for "ane paintted wreitting with ane marmaidden with ane crowne on hir heid", and then "passed his way". Two contemporary sketches of the mermaid and hare device were sent to England and remain in The National Archives. The design includes emblems drawn from Claude Paradin's Devises Heroïques. A circle of daggers implies that Bothwell awaits divine punishment.

Bothwell made a challenge to fight any accusers after his acquittal of Darnley's murder, and put his challenge on the door of St Giles. John Knox referred to this as Bothwell's "Rodomontade", a reference to Rodomonte in Orlando Furioso who fought the groom at a wedding. Knox says that Murray accepted but did not make his name known. There was no single combat. Bothwell subsequently married Mary.

At the battle of Carberry Hill in June 1567, Bothwell offered single combat to any of the Confederate Lords. William Kirkcaldy of Grange accepted the challenge, but Bothwell would not fight him because of his low status. He also refused to fight James Murray of Pardewis, and was reluctant to fight Lord Lindsay. Mary announced there would be no single combat and surrendered.

James Murray was made Edinburgh's customs official in August 1567, replacing James Curle. He is sometimes confused with James Murray, brother of the laird of Polmaise, who became Master of the Wardrobe to James VI.

In 1580, he delivered jewels belonging to his sister the Countess of Mar to John Sutherland. She wanted them to reset for the wedding of her son John Erskine in October. In August 1584, Parliament declared him a traitor for taking part in the "treasonable attempt at Stirling".

== Marriages ==
James Murray first married Marion Preston, a daughter of Simon Preston of Craigmillar Castle.

His second wife was Anna or Annas Lindsay. After his death in 1592, she married William Melville, Lord Tongland.

In April 1591, James Murray came to the Place of Gask and was a witness to the marriage contract of his niece Lilias Murray and John Grant of Freuchie (d. 1622). The wedding was celebrated at Tullibardine or Gask in June. James VI attended and participated in a masque in special costume.

James Murray died in September 1592. His heirs were his sons John and Patrick Murray of Pardewis. His daughter Jean Murray was contracted to marry Alexander Lindsay of Canterland in Marykirk, a son of David Lindsay of Edzell.

Pardewis was in Fife near Limekilns, which also belonged to James Murray, and in 1593 was included in the dower lands of Dunfermline Abbey granted to Anne of Denmark. Pardewis was also known as "Brumhill" in the 16th century, and a nearby property is now called "Broomhall". An artificial mound or motte is called the "Perdieus Mount". Murray and his wife also held Dunnygask near Dunfermline and other former Abbey properties, as tenants of the Queen.
