= John Grant of Freuchie (died 1585) =

Scottish landowner

John Grant of Freuchie (died 1585) was a Scottish landowner.

== Career ==
He was a son of James Grant of Freuchie (died 1553), and Elizabeth Forbes, a daughter of John Forbes, 6th Lord Forbes, or Christina Barclay.

His home was Freuchie, sometimes called Ballachastel, and now known as Castle Grant. He became the laird in 1553. John Grant fought at the battle of Glasgow in 1544. He is said to have jousted with Hugh Fraser, Lord Lovat, at Inverness Castle and lost.

Mary, Queen of Scots came to the north of Scotland on progress. The Earl of Huntly and the Gordon family were defeated at the battle of Corrichie. On 4 November, Mary ordered John Grant to take Drumin Castle, and he took possession on 3 December 1562.

As Laird of Grant or Freuchie, his estates included Urquhart and Glenmoriston, from which he was obliged to pay a "feu-duty" which contributed to the household and food expenses of Mary, Queen of Scots. In 1569, Regent Moray asked Grant to pay the money to William Douglas as a contribution to costs of keeping the deposed queen at Lochleven Castle.

He died in 1585 and was buried at Duthil Old Parish Church and Churchyard.

== Marriages and children ==
He married Margaret Stewart (died 1555), a daughter of John Stewart, 3rd Earl of Atholl. His second wife was Janet Leslie (died 1591), a daughter of George Leslie, 4th Earl of Rothes. His children included:

- Duncan Grant (1566–1582), his eldest son by Margaret Stewart, who died in his lifetime. Duncan married Margaret Mackintosh. Their son, John Grant, became Laird of Freuchie.
- Patrick Grant of Rothiemurchus, to whom he passed the Muckrach estate
- Elizabeth, Elspeth, or Isobel. She was betrothed to William Fraser of Stowie, married and divorced John Leslie of Balquhain, and married William Cuming of Inverallochy
- Grissel Grant, who married Patrick Grant, younger of Ballindalloch
- Margaret Grant, who married Alexander Gordon of Beldornie
- Katherine Grant
- Marjory Grant
- Barbara Grant, betrothed to Robert Munro, younger of Fowlis, married Colin Mackenzie of Kintail
- Helen Grant, betrothed to Donald McAngus McAlester younger of Glengarry.

After his death on 3 June 1585, his widow Janet Leslie was required to surrender various items to John Grant, his grandson. These included a chain of gold, gold bracelets, a cloak of French black with velvet facings, a black satin doublet, a pair of silk breeches, and a gilt clock. Janet Leslie later married James Elphinstone, a son of Alexander Elphinstone, 2nd Lord Elphinstone. She was known as Janet Leslie, Lady Naughton from her first marriage.
