= Idoch Castle =

14th-century castle east of Turriff, Scotland

Coordinates: 57.5308°N 2.3858°W

- Turriff, Aberdeenshire, Scotland in Scotland

Site history
- Fate: Demolished
- Demolished: 1850

Idoch Castle was a 14th-century castle about 3 miles (4.8 km) east of Turriff, Aberdeenshire Scotland, near Idoch Water, a tributary of the River Deveron.

The alternative name is "Little Idoch"’.

== History ==
Idoch Castle is supposed to have been built during the 14th century. The last vestige of the foundations was removed in 1850, when a large quantity of human bones and ashes were discovered.

== Structure ==
There is no record of the castle's structure.
