= Balquhain Castle =

Ruined tower house in Aberdeenshire, Scotland

- West of Inverurie, Aberdeenshire
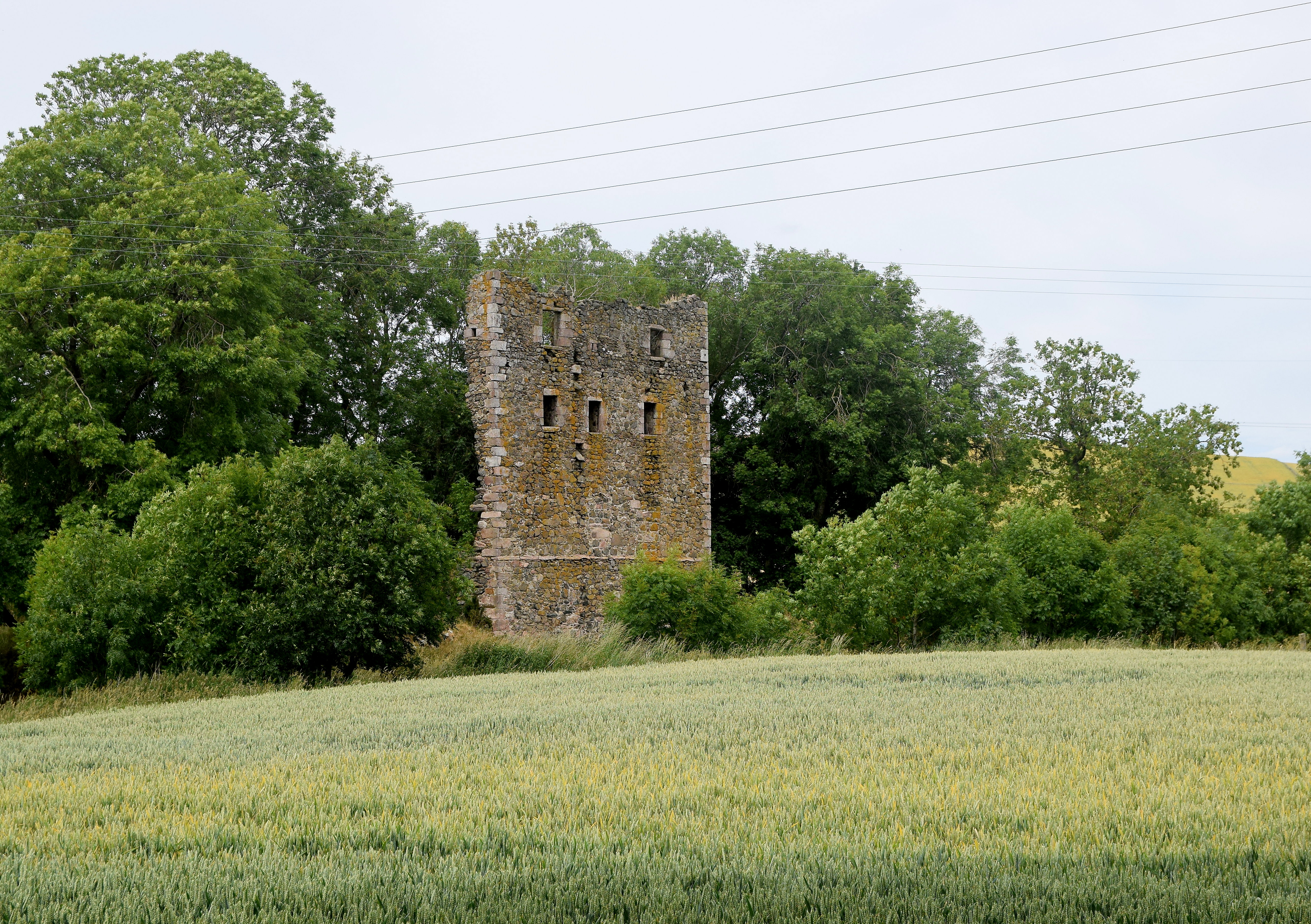
- Ruins of Balquhain Castle in 2018

Site information
- Type: Tower house
- Controlled by: Clan Leslie

Location
- Coordinates: 57.302225°N 2.447087°W

Site history
- Built: 15th century
- Built by: Clan Leslie
- Demolished: 1746

Scheduled monument
- Official name: Balquhain Castle
- Type: Secular: barmkin; castle; tower
- Designated: 30 July 1938
- Reference no.: SM90

Balquhain Castle is a ruined tower house in Aberdeenshire, Scotland. It served as the stronghold of the Leslies of Balquhain. The castle is located 4 kilometres (2.5 mi) to the west of Inverurie, and is protected as a scheduled monument.

== History ==
The place name was sometimes written as "Boquhane". The castle was built in the 15th century on lands held by the Leslie family from 1340. On 5 July 1441, John Leslie of Balquhain made an indenture with four masons, David Hardgat, David Dun, Robert Masoun and Gilbert Masoun that they would complete his building work.

The castle was sacked during a feud with the Forbes family in 1526. The castle was rebuilt in 1530. On 1 September 1562, Mary Queen of Scots stayed at the castle. William Leslie, laird of Balquhain, was a leader of her vanguard at the Battle of Corrichie.

In March 1563, Queen Mary forgave William Leslie of Balquhain for his dealings with the George Gordon, 4th Earl of Huntly. She wrote to him to make provisions for her if she visited again in August 1564. In 1579, an "annualrent" from the Leslie lands was granted to the poet Marie Maitland.

In 1588, John Leslie, laird of Balquhain, was involved unsuccessfully in a fishing dispute, supporting the rights of Thomas Leslie of Banff against burgesses in Aberdeen. John Leslie's son fought with some men from Aberdeen and the families of the wounded men protested with bloody shirts or sarks. The dispute was settled by James VI and the Earl of Huntly.

== John Leslie and Bessie Roy ==
John Leslie of Balquhain was married to Elspeth or Isobel Grant, a daughter of John Grant of Freuchie. John Leslie was accused of adultery with Janet Hunter in Aberdeen.

John Leslie employed a nurse for his children called Bessie Roy. In August 1590, she was involved in a trial for witchcraft and was acquitted. Among the accusations, it was said she had conjured up a worm in a lint field, and caused the death of a woman using a "plaid full of enchantments and sorcery". The incidents were supposed to have occurred when she worked for William King at Barra Castle around 1578, and she was alleged to have recently stolen a jewellery box from Balquhain by magic.

== The castle ==
Balquhain was burned by the forces of Prince William, Duke of Cumberland in 1746 and was abandoned. The tower measures 13.75 by 8.75 metres (45.1 by 28.7 ft), and is surrounded by the remains of a barmkin.
