= John Gordon of Findlater =

Scottish landowner (died 1562)

John Gordon of Findlater (died 1562) was a Scottish landowner involved in a feud with James Ogilvie of Cardell. He was executed in Aberdeen on 3 November 1562.

== Career ==
John Gordon was a son of George Gordon, 4th Earl of Huntly and Elizabeth Keith.

Alexander Ogilvie of Findlater Castle married Elizabeth Gordon, and in 1545 disinherited his son James Ogilvie in 1545 in favour of John Gordon, a relative of his second wife. On 28 September 1545, John Gordon obtained a royal charter permitting him to use the name and arms of Ogilvie, and confirming him as heir of Alexander Ogilvie and Elizabeth Gordon.

In 1546, John Gordon and Margaret Hay, a daughter of George Hay, 7th Earl of Erroll, were contracted to marry, but the marriage was not completed.

He was knighted as John Gordon or Ogilvie of Deskford at the marriage of the queen's brother James Stewart, who was at that time Earl of Mar, and Annas Keith.

John Gordon married Lady Findlater to secure his property (the Privy Council called her "his pretended spouse"), and then, according to the English diplomat Thomas Randolph, locked her in a "close room".

The disinherited James Ogilvie was a courtier serving Mary, Queen of Scots as a Master of Household. In June 1562, John Gordon fought with him and Lord Ogilvie in Edinburgh. Lord Ogilvie's right arm was injured. Mary wrote from Stirling Castle on 28 June to Edinburgh's burgh council, thanking them for their proceedings in the case. Gordon was held a prisoner, but escaped on 25 July. Mary went on progress to the north of Scotland, and there was armed conflict with the Earl of Huntly and the Gordon family.

Mary's Privy Council met at Darnaway Castle on 10 September 1563. "John Gordon of Deskford" was declared a traitor for failing to comply with previous summons for wounding Lord Ogilvy. The castles of Findlater and Auchindoun were to be surrendered to the queen's officers.

John Gordon's men defeated a detachment of the royal guard led by Captain Stewart near Findlater in October 1562 and took their weapons. While Mary was at Aberdeen, the Earl of Huntly sent a messenger to offer the keys of Auchindoun and Findlater, but this gesture was rejected.

John Gordon was captured at the battle of Corrichie and executed at Aberdeen on 3 November. He was beheaded after the executioner had struck several blows. John Lesley wrote that Mary shed tears at the news of the death of the Earl of Huntly, and her grief was increased at the execution of John Gordon.

On 4 June 1563, Mary gave some of John Gordon's properties near Banff to "John Stewart, Lord Darnley", at this time the Darnley title was used by John Stewart, Commendator of Coldingham.

Robert Gordon of Gordonstoun wrote that Mary pleaded with the Earl of Moray that he should be saved. He had been a favourite, even rumoured as a possible husband for Queen Mary. He described John Gordon as "a manly youth, extremely handsome, and just in the opening bloom of life". According to the Historie of the Reigne of Marie Queen of Scots, John Gordon's mother, Elizabeth Keith, Countess of Huntly, "a wittie woman", had tried to bring up the subject of this royal marriage with Queen Mary at Aberdeen, before the battle of Corrichie. The poet Pierre de Bocosel de Chastelard mentioned Mary's affection for John Gordon.
