= Huntly Castle =

Ruined castle in Scotland

- Huntly, Aberdeenshire
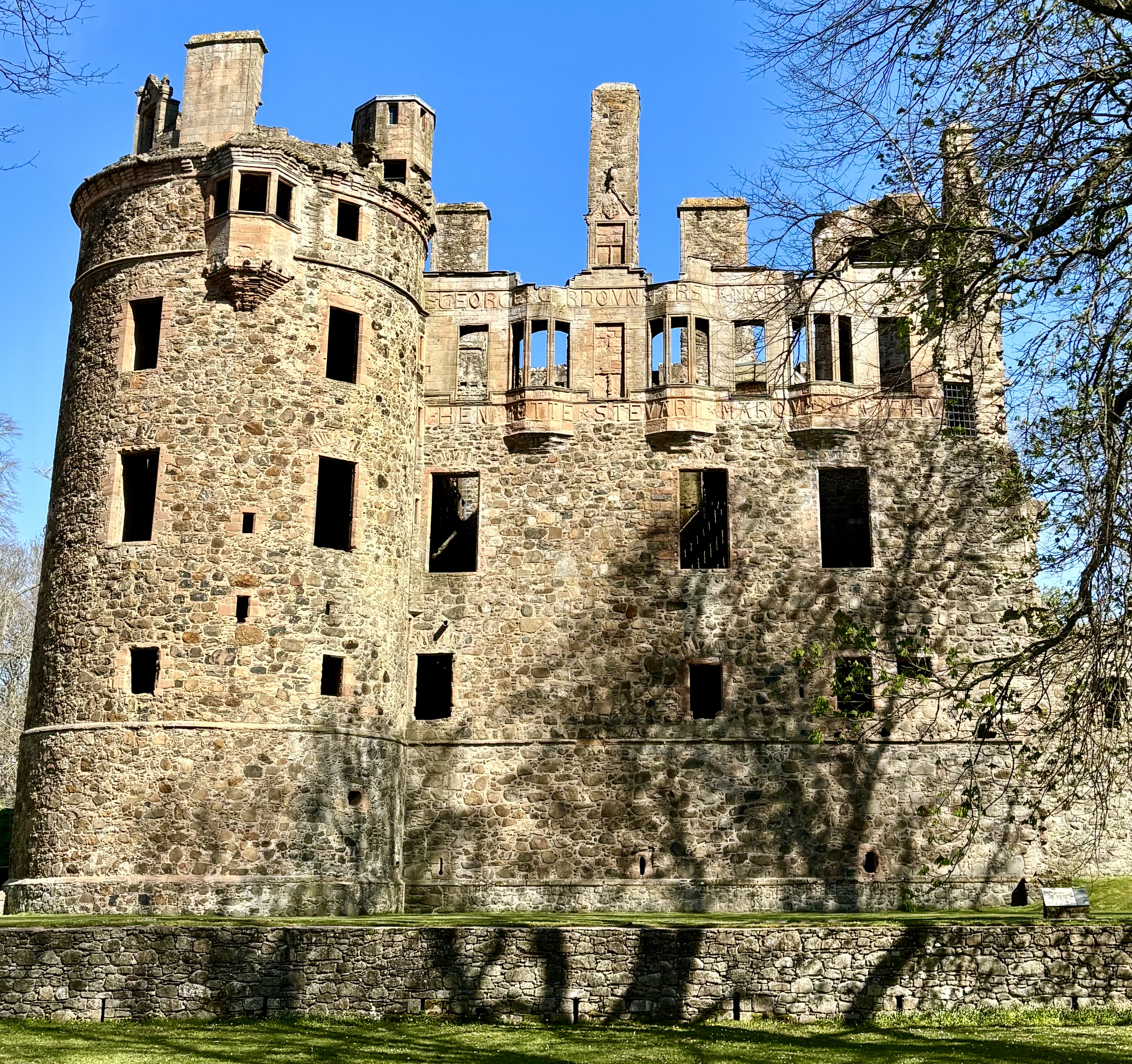
- Huntly Castle in 2025

Site information
- Type: L-plan tower house
- Controlled by: Strathbogie family (1100-1314) Clan Gordon (1314- )

Location
- Coordinates: 57.45488°N 2.78117°W

Site history
- Built: 12th century
- Built by: Duncan II, Earl of Fife
- Events

Scheduled monument
- Official name: Huntly Castle
- Type: Secular: bridge; castle; motte; well
- Designated: 31 December 1921
- Reference no.: SM90165

Huntly Castle is a ruined castle north of Huntly in Aberdeenshire, Scotland, where the rivers Deveron and Bogie meet. It was the ancestral home of the chief of Clan Gordon, Earl of Huntly. There have been four castles built on the site that have been referred to as Huntly Castle, Strathbogie Castle or Peel of Strathbogie.

== Location ==
Huntly Castle was built on the crossing of the rivers Deveron and Bogie, north of Huntly and roughly 40 miles from Aberdeen. The original wooden castle was built on a motte. The second castle, made of stone, was built on the northern end of the bailey. The third and modern castles were built to the east of the original, at the southern end of the estate.

== History ==
The castle was originally built by Duncan II, Earl of Fife, on the Strathbogie estate sometime around 1180 and 1190. The castle became known as the Peel of Strathbogie.

The Earl Duncan's third son, David, inherited the Strathbogie estate and later, through marriage, became earls of Atholl around 1204. During the Strathbogie family's time at the estate, Robert the Bruce was a guest after falling ill at Inverurie. The family was loyal to him and when he got better, Robert the Bruce went on to win the battle of Bannockburn. However, around 1314, David of Strathbogie shifted his support to the English right before Robert the Bruce won the battle of Bannockburn. Robert the Bruce saw this as treachery and granted the castle and estate to Sir Adam Gordon of Huntly because he was consistently loyal. In 1506, the castle was officially renamed Huntly Castle.

=== Reign of James IV ===
Although the castle was burned to the ground, a grander castle was built in its place. In 1496, the pretender to the English throne, Perkin Warbeck, was married to Lady Catherine Gordon the daughter of George Gordon, 2nd Earl of Huntly, witnessed by King James IV of Scotland at Edinburgh. James IV came to Huntly in October 1501 and gave gifts of money to the stonemasons working on the castle. In October 1503, James IV came again and played in a shooting contest at a target called a "prop". He came back again in the following October, on his way south, accompanied by four Italian minstrels and an African drummer known as the "More taubronar". James IV played cards at the castle on 10 October 1505 and gave a tip to masons working on the building. These visits were part of his annual pilgrimage to the shrine of Saint Duthac at Tain. Architecturally the L plan castle consists of a well-preserved five-story tower with an adjoining great hall and supporting buildings. Areas of the original ornate facade and interior stonework remain. Wings were added to the castle in the 16th and 17th centuries.

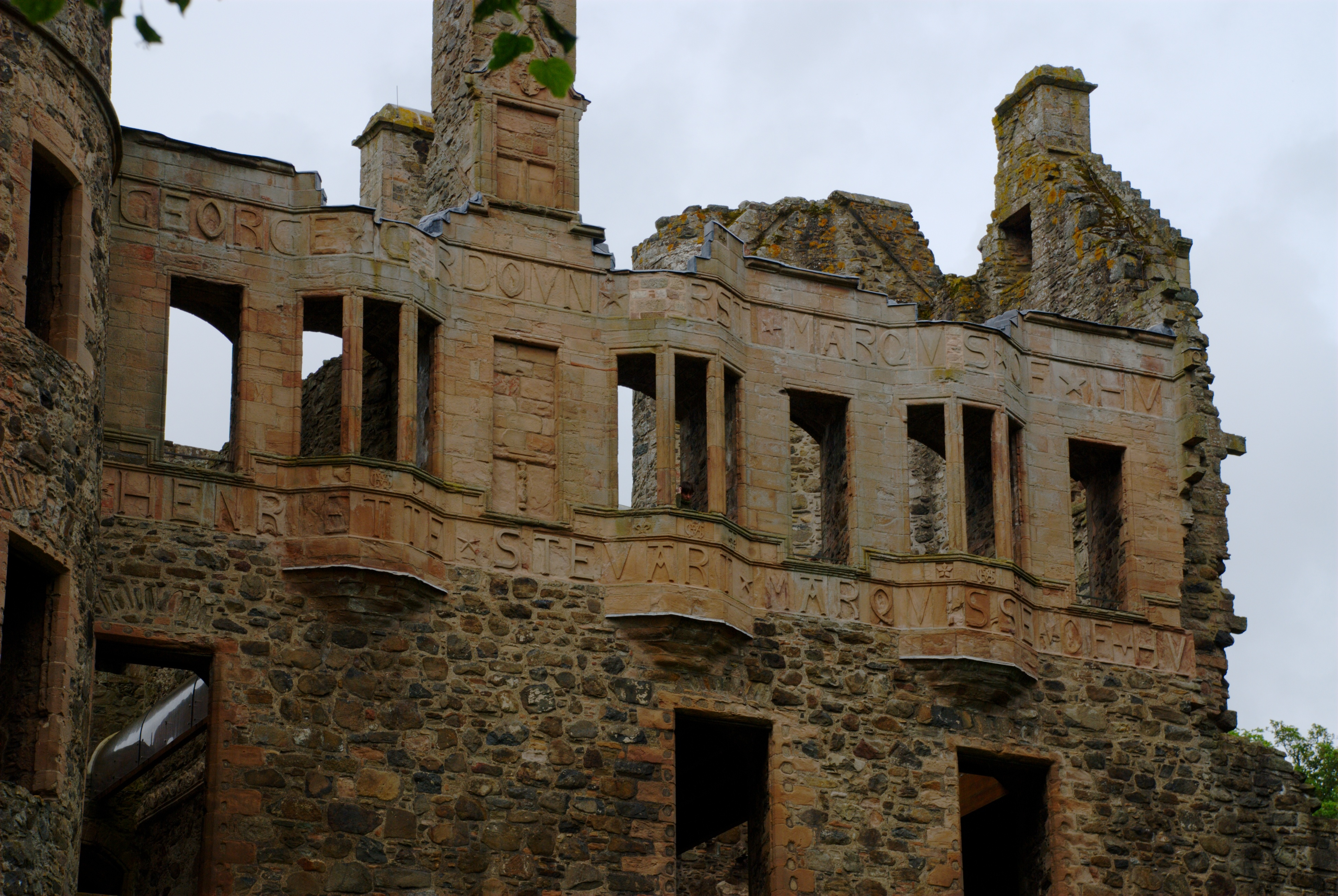
Carved inscriptions feature on the facade

=== Reign of Mary, Queen of Scots ===
William Mackintosh was executed on 23 August 1550 at "Castle Strathbogie", as a conspirator against the Earl of Huntly, the queen's lieutenant in the North. It is said that Elizabeth Keith, Countess of Huntly gave the order. Regent Arran came to Huntly in 1552. When the Earl of Huntly wrote to Mary of Guise from the castle in August 1553, he dated the letter from "your grace's place of Huntle". Mary of Guise visited in 1555 or 1556. According to Robert Gordon of Straloch, Mary of Guise was impressed with the quantity of food stored in cellars and larders at the castle, supplied by the earl's distant retainers, but the French diplomat Henri Cleutin advised the earl was too powerful.

The English diplomat Thomas Randolph stayed two nights in September 1562, and wrote that the castle was "fayer, beste furnishede of anye howse that I have seen in thys countrie." Mary, Queen of Scots decided to take the castle, giving as a cause that the Earl withheld from her a royal cannon lent to him by Regent Arran. She sent her half-brother John Stewart, Commendator of Coldingham to arrest the George Gordon, 4th Earl of Huntly at Huntly Castle in October 1562. On the day William Kirkcaldy of Grange and the Tutor of Pitcur arrived first and surrounded the house. While Kirkcaldy was talking to the castle porter, the castle watchman on the tower spotted Coldingham and the Master of Lindsay and their troops a mile off. He alerted the Earl, who ran without "boot or sword" and hopped over a low wall at the back of the castle and found a horse before Pitcur could stop him. Elizabeth Keith, Countess of Huntly then welcomed the queen's men and gave them a meal and showed them around the place. She still had her chapel furnished for Roman Catholic worship.

Mary made plans to come to Huntly Castle in person at this time, and another half brother, Lord James, Earl of Moray, who was in Aberdeen, sent invitations to the laird of Kilravock and others on 21 October 1563. This meeting of her "lieges of Moray and Nairn" did not take place.

George Gordon, 4th Earl of Huntly died after the Battle of Corrichie on 28 October 1562, and the castle was garrisoned for Queen Mary by Charles Crawfurd and twenty soldiers. Furnishings including beds and 45 tapestries were carted to Aberdeen and shipped in barrels to Edinburgh for the royal collection and refurbishment by Servais de Condé. After the surrender of Mary, Queen of Scots, at the battle of Carberry Hill, the Earl of Bothwell came north to meet George Gordon, 5th Earl of Huntly at "Stawboggye", and moved on to Spynie Castle after Huntly deserted his cause. In July 1570, after the Rising of the North in England, the exiled Earl of Westmorland found refuge at Huntly and the Countess of Northumberland at Pluscarden.

=== John Gordon, Earl of Sutherland ===
John Gordon, 11th Earl of Sutherland and his wife Marion Seton were poisoned at Helmsdale Castle in 1567 by Isobel Sinclair, the wife of Gordon of Gartly. Isobel Seton's own son also died, but the fifteen-year-old heir of Sutherland, Alexander Gordon was unharmed. He was made to marry the Earl of Caithness' daughter Barbara Sinclair. In 1569 he escaped from the Sinclairs to Huntly Castle and remained at Huntly until he came of age in 1573. Barbara Sinclair died, and on 13 December 1573 Alexander Gordon, now Earl of Sutherland, married Jean Gordon, former wife of the Earl of Bothwell, who had also found a refuge at Huntly Castle.

=== A fatal football match ===
An early description of the death of George Gordon, 5th Earl of Huntly in 1576, transcribed or copied down by Richard Bannatyne as "The Maner of the Erle of Huntlies Death", gives some details of how the castle was used, and has been examined by historians including Charles McKean and Jenny Wormald. The Earl of Huntly was a healthy man and had been out hunting hares and a fox at Winton's Wood. After returning to Huntly, he suffered a stroke after dinner, or a collapse caused by food poisoning, while playing football outside the Castle on the Green.

The Earl was given his cloak, and began to stagger as he approached the castle's outer gate, falling in a puddle. He was helped by the Master of Huntly to his own bedchamber in the round tower of the palace block, which was then called the "New Warke of Strathbogie." The tower room was adjacent to the "Grit Chalmer", the Great Chamber. After the Earl died, his brother Adam Gordon arranged for his body was laid out in the "Chamber of Dais", another name for the Great Chamber, and his valuables in boxes in coffers were secured in the same chamber and the outer chamber door of the suite was locked.

After the Earl's steward left the castle, a number of alleged supernatural events occurred beginning with the sudden collapse of one of the servants who had gathered in the "Laich Chalmer", Low Chamber. This "Laich Chalmer" was in another part of the castle, under a stair, opposite the "Auld Hall." On the following day, a servant went up to the Gallery at the top of the "New Warke" a room where valuable spices were stored (near the room where the Earl's body lay). This servant and two companions also collapsed and when revived complained of feeling cold.

After the Earl's body was embalmed by the Aberdeen surgeon William Urquhart and taken to the chapel, the Earl's brother Patrick Gordon heard unexplained sounds while sitting on bench near the room where the body had been embalmed. It was said that "there is not a live thing bigger than a mouse may enter in that chamber with the door locked." References to a "leather chamber" at the castle in some retellings of the story likely derive from Scots terms "laich" and "letter" for the secondary or lower servant's hall. The account is hostile to the Gordon family, and ends with a complaint that Regent Morton and the young James VI were sympathetic to them, James VI is supposed to have wished the Lord Gordon should be brought to be his companion at Stirling Castle.

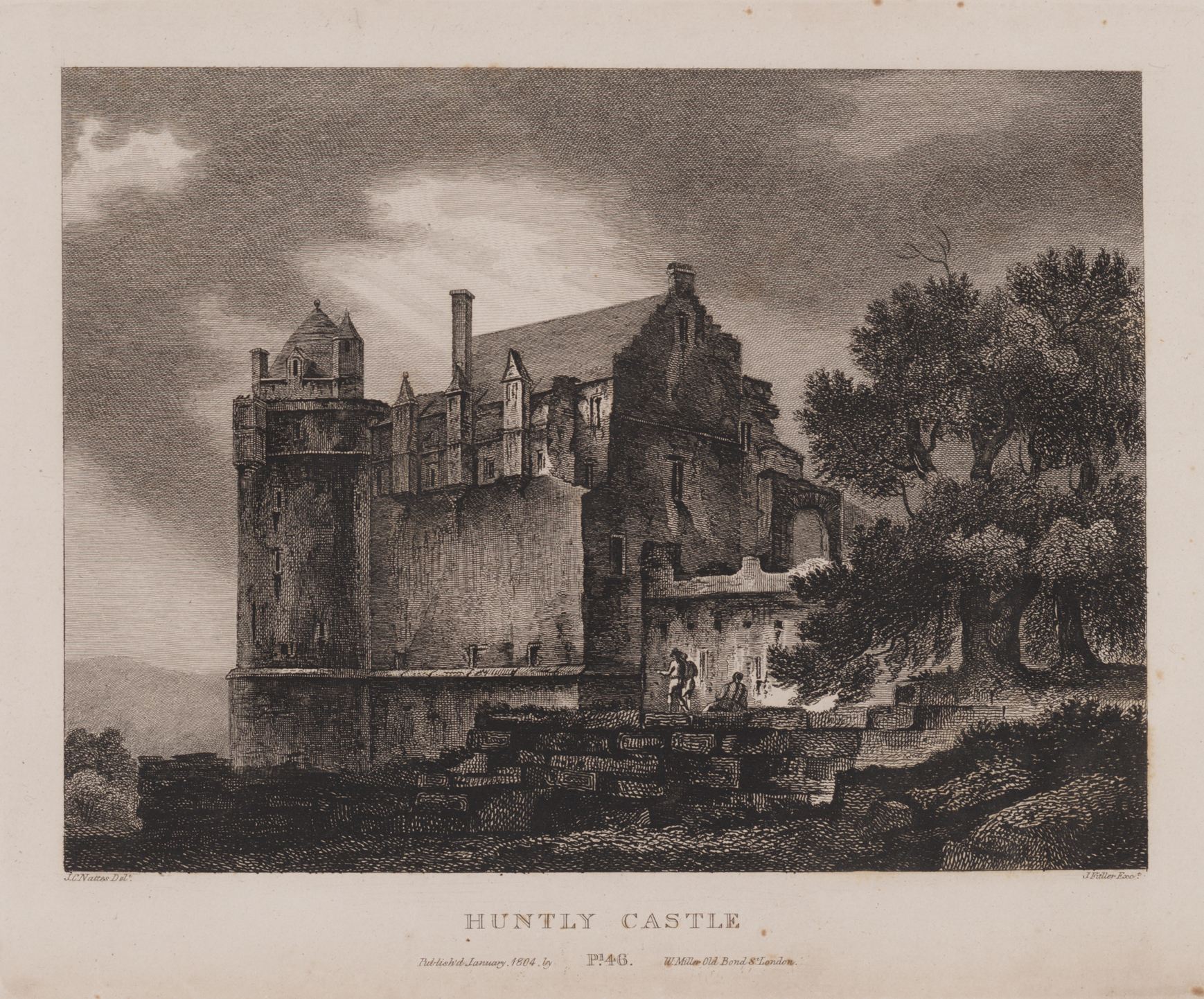
Engraving of the castle by James Fittler in Scotia Depicta, published 1804

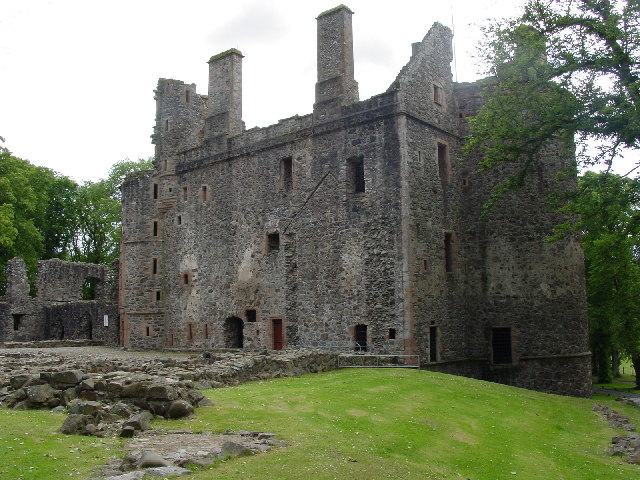
Rear courtyard ruins of Huntly Castle

=== James VI slights the castle ===
In March 1584 an English recusant Catholic Sir Thomas Gerard of Bryn was sent by Lady Ferniehirst to find refuge at Huntly. George Gordon, 6th Earl of Huntly was a Catholic and James VI decided to subdue his power in the north. The king arrived at Huntly on 26 April 1589 after spending a night at Kintore. The Earl of Huntly had fled to the mountains, stripping the countryside and emptying the house of furniture. James brought 100 workmen to demolish the castle. Huntly sent the king an offer to spare the house and surrendered.

In March 1593 a royal garrison of 16 men commanded by Archie Carmichael was to be put in Huntly Castle. In May 1593 the Earl captured a man called Pedder in the lands of Atholl. Pedder was hanged and dismembered and his body parts displayed on poles at Huntly.

In April 1594 a Flemish ship came to Montrose and it was suspected that a messenger rode to Huntly Castle with a bag of Spanish gold. In July, the Earl was overseeing the building of a new hall and gallery. Following the battle of Glenlivet, James VI came with workmen again and his master of works William Schaw, and planned to blow up the "gret old tower" which had been "fourteen years in building" on 29 October 1594. The kirk minister Andrew Melville was with the king and a vocal advocate for demolition. Aberdeen town council bought twenty stones in weight of gunpowder for the demolition of Huntly and other places, and sent the stonemason John Fraser and other workmen to the demolition work at Huntly and Old Slains Castle, equipped with new shovels.

The royal council met at Terrisoule to discuss the planned demolition on 28 October. Some Lords wanted the fortress kept to hold a loyal garrison. James VI still wished the whole castle, the new and old work, to be slighted. It was decided not to completely demolish Huntly and Slains Castle and other houses, but preserve them for the convenience of the royal garrisons. It was also said that the pleas of the Countesses of Huntly and Erroll to save the houses were successful. David Foulis wrote to Anthony Bacon that Henrietta Stewart, Countess of Huntly, watched the demolition at Huntly and was not allowed to have an audience with the king to plead her case. The king made his friend Sir John Gordon of Pitlurg the keeper of the remaining buildings at Huntly.

=== Restored for a Marquess ===
The Marquess of Huntly restored and rebuilt the castle. In 1746, an English soldier, James Ray, saw the ruins and commented on ceilings, still decorated with "history-painting".

Huntly spent large sums restoring and enlarging the castle in April 1597. The restored facade of the main block was carved with the names and titles of the marquess, "George Gordon" and his wife, "Henrietta Stewart" who was a favourite of the queen, Anne of Denmark. In February 1603 James VI made plans to resolve the Marquess's feuds including a royal visit to Huntly with Anne of Denmark and the Earl of Moray later in the year. The visit did not take place because of the death of Elizabeth I and the subsequent Union of the Crowns.

The Castle was occupied in 1640 by a Scottish Covenanter army under Major-General Robert Monro. James Gordon, Parson of Rothiemay, tells us how the house "was preserved from being rifled or defaced, except some emblems and imagery, which looked somewhat popish and superstitious lycke; and therefore, by the industry of one captain James Wallace (one of Munro's foote captaines) were hewd and brocke doune off the frontispiece of the house; but all the rest of the frontispiece containing Huntly's scutcheon, etc, was left untouched, as it stands to this daye."

Captured in October 1644, the castle was briefly held by James Graham, 1st Marquess of Montrose against the Duke of Argyll. In 1647 it was gallantly defended against General David Leslie by Lord Charles Gordon, but its 'Irish' garrison was starved into surrender. Savage treatment was meted out, for the men were hanged and their officers beheaded. In December of the same year the Marquess of Huntly himself was captured and on his way to execution at Edinburgh was detained, by a refinement of cruelty, in his own mansion. His escort was shot against its walls.

An inventory made by the garrison on 10 November 1648 shows the state rooms were still fully furnished, including the earl's "chapel bed" and the "laich chamber or common hall". There were portraits of King Charles, James VI, Anne of Denmark, and Robert Maxwell, 1st Earl of Nithsdale, and others. An ammunition house contained 81 muskets, match cord, and ten cannon. In 1650 Charles II visited briefly on his way to the Battle of Worcester, defeat and exile. The Civil War brought an end to the Gordon of Huntly family's long occupation of the castle.

=== Jacobites and after ===
In 1689, during the first Jacobite rising, the castle was briefly the headquarters for Viscount Dundee and his Jacobite army, at the end of April, just after the start of the revolt. However, by the early eighteenth century the castle was already in decay and providing material for predatory house builders in the village. In 1746, during a later Jacobite rising, it was occupied by British government troops. Thereafter, it became a common quarry until a groundswell of antiquarian sentiment in the 19th century came to the rescue of the noble pile.

Huntly Castle remained under the ownership of the Clan Gordon until 1923. Today, the remains of the castle are cared for by Historic Environment Scotland as a scheduled monument.

Pure Strength I, a major international strongman competition, was held on the grounds of Huntly Castle in 1987. The winner of the contest was Jón Páll Sigmarsson of Iceland.

== In fiction ==
Huntly, as the Castle of Strathbogie, is described in a fictionalised account of the reign of Mary, Queen of Scots, The Queen's Cause by Mrs Hubert Barclay (1938).
