= Gartly Castle =

Location
- Coordinates: 57.3897°N 2.7770°W

Site history
- Built: 12th or 13th century

Gartly Castle was a 15th-century castle, about 1 mile (1.6 km) north-east of Gartly, Aberdeenshire, Scotland, and 4 miles (6.4 km) south of Huntly, east of the River Bogie.

== History ==
The Barclays were the owners of the site from the 12th to the 16th century. Before her defeat of the Gordons at the Battle of Corrichie in October 1562, Mary, Queen of Scots stayed here. Mary stayed at Gartley again in August 1564.

The castle ruins were demolished in 1975, with the last remains removed by 1982.

== Structure ==
There is no longer any trace of the castle, which had a keep. In 1780 it was reported to Thomas Pennant that the castle was “an old building,.., placed on a small mount, and surrounded with a deep ditch. It is a square tower; one end of it is fallen down, and shews a section of strong vaulted rooms; but there seemed nothing so singular in its structure, as to merit more particular attention”.

Gartly Castle was constructed on a natural mound about 17 metres (56 ft) across and up to 2.5 metres (8 ft 2 in) high. There was a ditch to the south, east and west.

- Castles in Great Britain and Ireland
- List of castles in Scotland
