= Findlater Castle =

Castle on the coast of Banff and Buchan, Aberdeenshire, Scotland

- Banff and Buchan, Aberdeenshire in Scotland
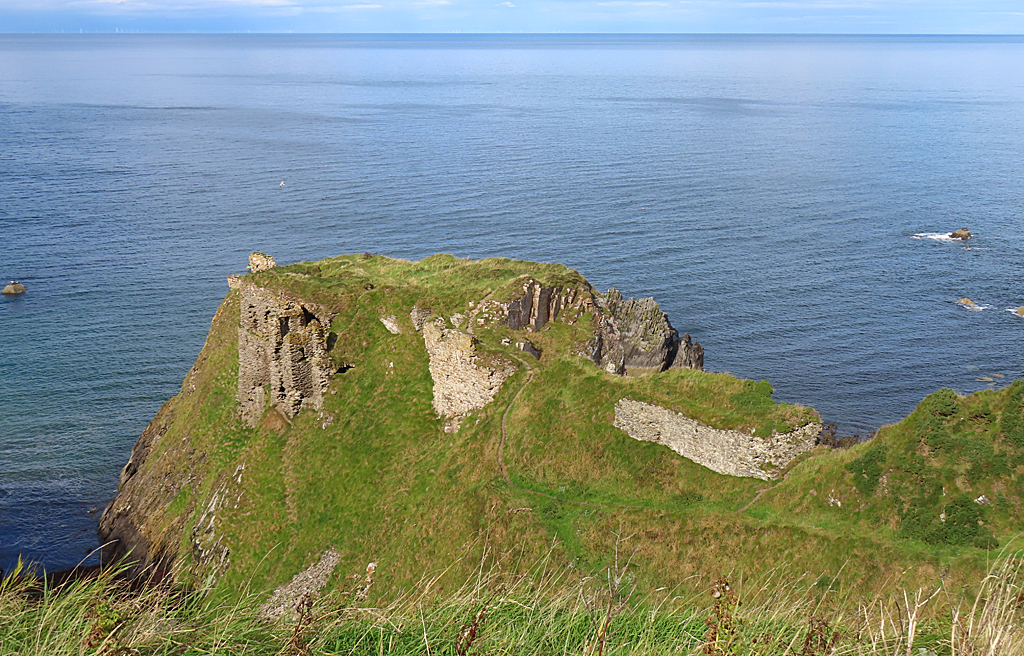
- Ruins of the castle in 2024

Site information
- Condition: Ruined

Location
- Coordinates: 57°41′32.60″N 2°46′13.47″W

Scheduled monument
- Official name: Findlater Castle
- Type: Secular: castle
- Designated: 23 December 1969
- Reference no.: SM2846

Findlater Castle shown within the United Kingdom
(grid reference NJ541672)

Findlater Castle is the old seat of the Earls of Findlater and Seafield, sitting on a 50-foot (15 m)-high cliff overlooking the Moray Firth on the coast of Banff and Buchan, Aberdeenshire, Scotland.

== Location and etymology ==
It lies about 15 km (9.3 mi) west of Banff, near the village of Sandend, between Cullen and Portsoy. The cliffs here contain quartz; the name "Findlater" is derived from the Scots Gaelic words fionn ("white") and leitir ("cliff or steep slope").

== History ==
The first historical reference to the castle is from 1246. King Alexander III of Scotland repaired this castle in the 1260s in preparation for an invasion by King Haakon IV of Norway. The Norwegians took and held the castle for some time. The castle remains that are still there are from the 14th-century rebuilding, when the castle was redesigned based on the Roslyn Castle model. Walter Ogilvy obtained a licence to repair and rebuild the castle from James II of Scotland in February 1445.

James V of Scotland visited Findlater in November 1535 after a pilgrimage to Tain. James Ogilvy, Laird of Findlater, was Master of Household to Mary of Guise and Mary, Queen of Scots. He lost his inheritance to John Gordon, a son of the Earl of Huntly, after making a plan to imprison his father in a cellar to deprive him of sleep and drive him insane to obtain his lands. After his father's death his mother married John Gordon, who then took possession of the castle and lands, and promptly imprisoned her.

John Gordon fought with James Ogilvy and Lord Ogilvy in July 1562 and injured Lord Ogilvie's arm. Gordon was imprisoned in Edinburgh until his victim healed, according to custom. In September 1562, Mary, Queen of Scots sent an army equipped with artillery from Dunbar Castle to besiege Findlater, and eject John Gordon. When Mary was nearby on 20 September, she had sent her trumpeter messenger to deliver the castle to the captain of her guard, but he was refused. In October 1562, the Earl of Huntly sent Mary the keys of Findlater and Auchindoun, but she was suspicious of the low status of the messenger. Huntly was defeated at the battle of Corrichie and John Gordon was executed.

James Ogilvy, 1st Earl of Findlater, was given the earldom in 1638. He built the nearby Cullen House to take the place of the castle as the family seat and by the time he died in 1653 it was little used and in decline.
