= River Bogie =

River in Aberdeenshire, Scotland

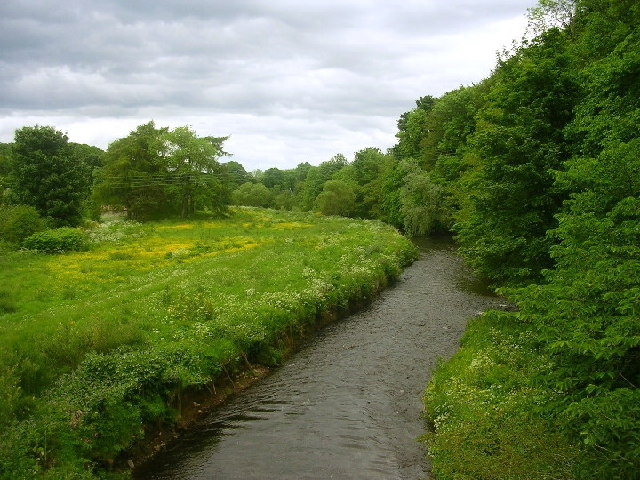
- The River Bogie near Huntly
- Native name: Balgaidh (Scottish Gaelic)

Location
- Country: Scotland

Physical characteristics
- Source
  - location: confluence of the Craig and Corchinan burns
  - coordinates: 57.2943°N 2.8910°W
- Mouth: River Deveron
  - location: Huntly, Scotland
  - coordinates: 57.45870°N 2.76951°W

The River Bogie (Scottish Gaelic: Balgaidh), also known as the Water of Bogie, is a river in north-west Aberdeenshire in the north east of Scotland. It is noted for its brown trout fishing.

Starting with the confluence of the Craig and Corchinan burns (57.2943°N 2.8910°W), near the parish of Auchindoir and Kearn, the River Bogie flows northeast for about 11 miles through Strathbogie to Rhynie and Huntly, immediately after which it joins the River Deveron (57.4587°N 2.7690°W), of which it forms one of the two main tributaries.

During the 19th century, the Bogie provided the linen bleachfields of Huntly, then a major textile centre, with water. 'Bogieside', the area along the banks of the river, is often referred to in local literature and folksongs, such as Adieu tae Bogieside and Bogie's Bonnie Belle.
