= River Deveron =

River in north east Scotland

Deveron
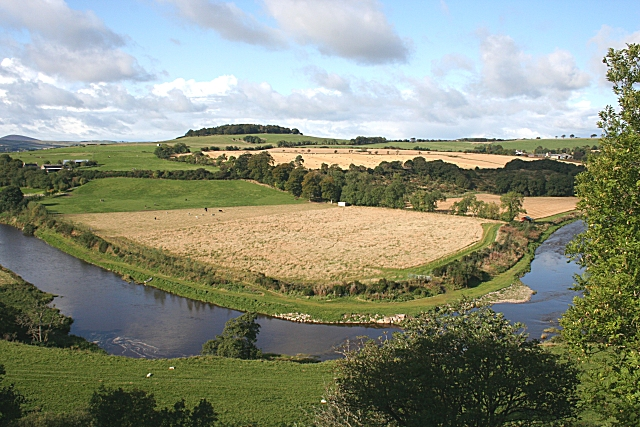
- River Deveron near Inverkeithny
- Native name: Uisge Dubh Èireann (Scottish Gaelic)

Location
- Country: Scotland

Physical characteristics
- Source: Ladder Hills
- Mouth: Moray Firth
  - coordinates: 57°40′N 2°31′W
- Length: 60 mi (97 km)

The River Deveron (Scottish Gaelic: Uisge Dubh Èireann, old Doric: Dovern) is a river in the north east of Scotland. The river has a length of 60 miles (97 km), and has a reputation for its Atlantic salmon, sea trout and brown trout fishing. In its upper reaches peaty water flows over a bottom of shingle and rock and is fast flowing.

Before being bridged at Banff, the river had to be crossed by "an uncertain ferry which would have landed you somewhere in the neighbourhood of the Old Market Place". The first bridge, built in 1765, was swept away three years later, followed in 1773 by the sinking of the ferry. A new one, designed by John Smeaton, was completed in 1779.

== Course ==
The river has its source in the Ladder Hills between Glenbuchat and the Cabrach, part of the Grampian range. It begins as a small highland stream among peaty and heather covered country before leaving the hills and entering the rolling lowlands of fertile farmland. The two main streams in its upper course are the Alt Deveron and the Black Water. Some 17 miles downstream from the river's source, the river passes through the town of Huntly, where it is joined by its tributary, the River Bogie.

Four miles further downstream the Deveron's second tributary, the River Isla flows in from the northwest. From this point on the Deveron becomes a mature river, pursuing a winding course through Turriff and finally flowing into the Moray Firth between the twin towns of Banff and Macduff.

== In literature ==
The Deveron is "the dark-rolling stream Duvranna" of James Macpherson's Ossian.
