= Battle of Corrichie =

Battle fought near Meikle Tap, near Aberdeen, Scotland, on 28 October 1562

Coordinates: 57.1114°N 2.5022°W

- Part of Mary, Queen of Scots Civil Wars
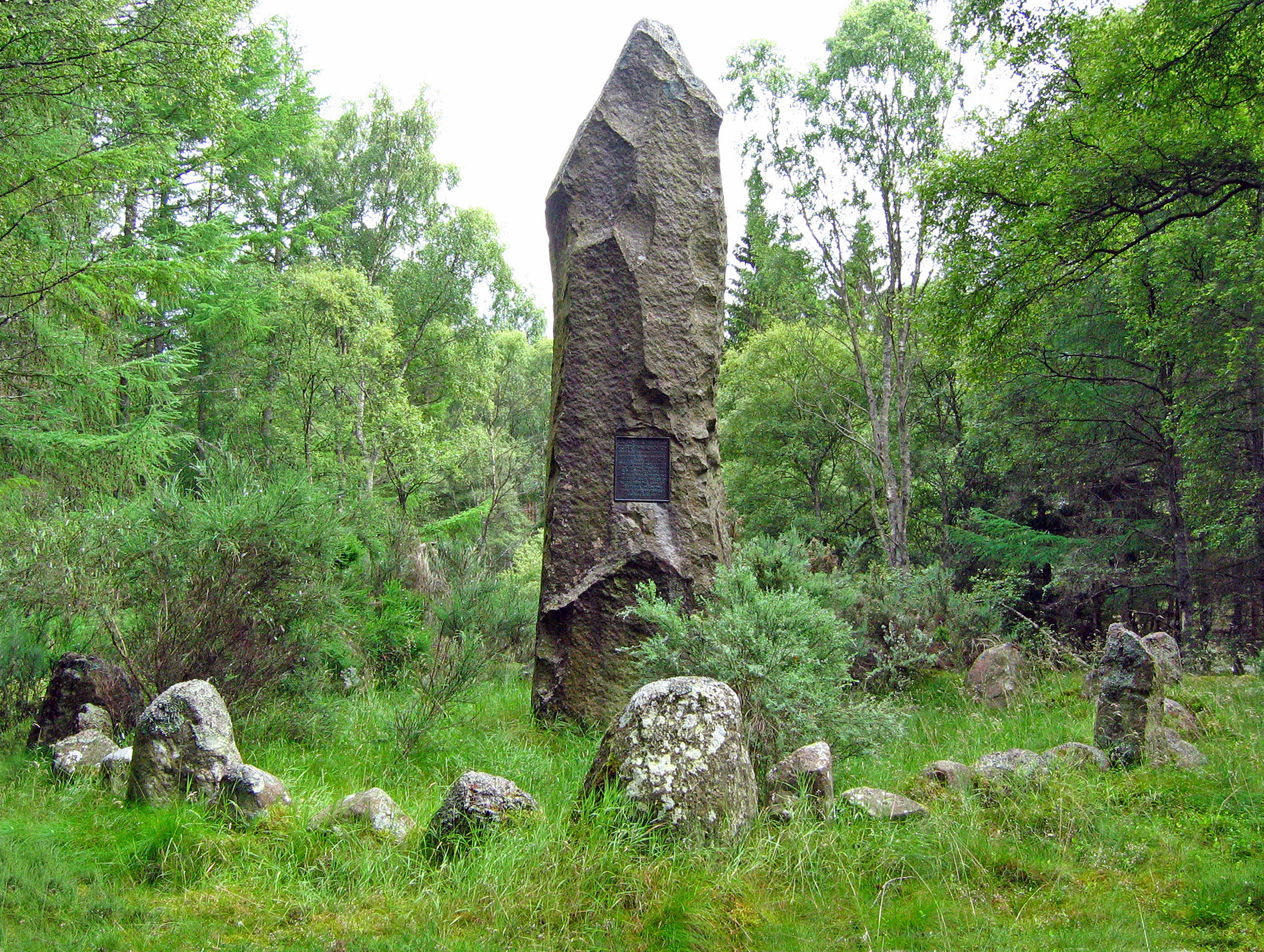
- Monument to the Battle of Corrichie
Date	28 October 1562
Location	Howe of Corrichie, near Banchory, Aberdeenshire, Scotland
Result	Victory for Queen Mary's forces

Belligerents
Kingdom of Scotland: Clan Fraser; Clan Munro; Clan Mackenzie; Clan Mackintosh; Clan Mackay; Clan Murray; Clan Forbes; Clan Cameron	Rebels: Clan Gordon; Clan Brodie

Commanders and leaders
Earl of Moray; Earl of Atholl; Earl of Morton	Earl of Huntly

Strength
2,000	500

Casualties and losses
None	120 killed 100 captured

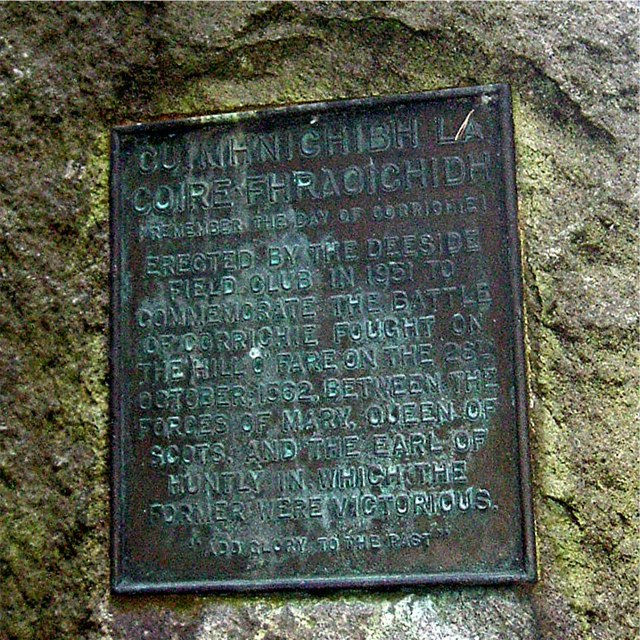
Close-up of monument marking the site of the Battle of Corrichie near the Black Moss and Red Moss

The Battle of Corrichie was fought on the slopes of the Hill of Fare in Aberdeenshire, Scotland, on 28 October 1562. It was fought between the forces of George Gordon, 4th Earl of Huntly, chief of Clan Gordon, and the forces of Mary, Queen of Scots, under James Stewart, 1st Earl of Moray.

Huntly had defeated the English twenty years earlier at the Battle of Haddon Rig; however, at Corrichie he was defeated by Queen Mary's forces, and apparently he died of apoplexy after his capture. Mary had come in person to the north of Scotland intent on confronting the power of the Gordons. At Corrichie, the Gordons' tactic of charging with swords was defeated by Moray's pike drill.

== Context ==
George Buchanan described the events of 1562 in his History of Scotland. The Earl of Huntly had lost the earldoms of Moray and Mar, which he considered his heritage, and became an enemy of the new Earl of Moray, the half-brother of Mary, Queen of Scots. Mary and Moray arrived at Aberdeen in mid-August, and met the Earl and Countess of Huntly. A stumbling block in their discussions was the case of their son, John Gordon who had fought with James Ogilvie in Edinburgh. Mary wished that he be imprisoned in Stirling Castle. (It had previously been suggested that John might marry Mary, but only in order to manipulate his father.) Mary and Huntly journeyed together towards Huntly Castle but the Queen, impatient at Huntly's refusal to hand over his son turned back. The English diplomat Thomas Randolph wrote that Mary came within four miles of Huntly Castle, but would not go there. Randolph accepted an invitation and stayed two nights, commenting that the house was "fayer, beste furnishede of anye howse that I have seen in thys countrie."

Mary and her court then travelled to Inverness Castle, but the Gordon Captain refused to give the royal castle to the Queen's representative. At this time the Clan Chattan deserted Huntly and joined the Queen, and others of what Buchanan calls the "ancient Scots" meaning the Gàidhealtachd came to her aid, with the Frasers and Munros. They easily took Inverness Castle on 9 September, and the Gordon garrison was executed (or at least, the Captain). Mary and her court returned to Aberdeen. Huntly tried to get intelligence of the Queen's intentions via his cousin the Earl of Sutherland, but Sutherland's correspondence was discovered and he was forced to flee. Huntly was now close to Aberdeen at Corrichie.

The English diplomat Thomas Randolph, who accompanied Queen Mary to Aberdeen, described the battle in letters to William Cecil. These letters add more detail. Randolph says that Huntly had a royal cannon at Huntly Castle (then called Strathbogie) which he had been given by Regent Arran. Mary demanded its return with short notice. Her men went to Huntly Castle on 9 October and attempted to capture the Earl, but he escaped over a low wall at the back gate. The Countess of Huntly stayed at Strathbogie and the Earl went to his house at Badenoch, the site of Ruthven Barracks, and was declared a rebel on 17 October. John Knox mentions another incident which angered the Queen; Mary had sent Captain Stewart with 60 men to seize Findlater Castle. They were surprised in the night at Cullen by Huntly's son John Gordon and sustained a number of casualties.

== Corrichie, hill, and marsh ==
According to Thomas Randolph, Huntly marched towards Aberdeen with 700 men, and was said to have intended to capture the Queen. Two thousand men led by the Earls of Moray, Atholl and Morton encircled his encampment on 28 October 1562. The Gordons, now numbering 500, had camped on a hill (said Randolph), where the cavalry could not reach them, but arquebus shot drove them down to marshy ground where they were cornered. The Queen's army attacked, and at first her vanguard lost their nerve and threw away their spears. The Earl of Moray forced them to fight. Randolph wrote the battle ended "incontinent" meaning it was over straight away. About 120 Gordons were killed and about 100 captured. Randolph wrote that none of the Queen's army were killed but many were hurt and many horses were killed. The Earl of Huntly was mounted on a horse to be taken to Aberdeen as a captive and before leaving the battlefield suddenly and soundlessly died. George Buchanan says that Huntly waited for Moray's army in "a place surrounded by marshes," and "fortified by nature." Moray gained a small hill as a vantage point that overlooked Huntly's position. Buchanan wrote that Moray's vanguard broke because of the many 'traitors,' who would not fight against Huntly and fixed heather on their bonnets. He continues that the Gordons threw away their spears expecting to use their swords in a pursuit. Moray and his second line stayed firm with extended pikes, despite the retreating vanguard who were forced to go around the pike line on either side. Moray's pikemen won the day because of the length of their pikes, Huntly's men being unable to approach.

John Knox in his History of the Reformation gave further details. The Earl of Huntly got up late on the morning of the battle which did not help morale. Knox gives him some speeches, making the observation that Moray's vanguard was composed of his friends, and the small company on the hill side (Moray's pikemen) were to be feared. Huntly's position was Corrichie Burn or the Fara Bank, meaning a slope amidst the Hills o'Fare. After the vanguard broke, Knox credits the resolution of the second line to John Wishart of Pitarrow, the Master of Lindsay, and the Tutor of Pitcur who marched forward with their "spears" through the retreating vanguard. Knox attributes a speech to the Queen's secretary William Maitland of Lethington who prayed for victory.

== Aftermath ==
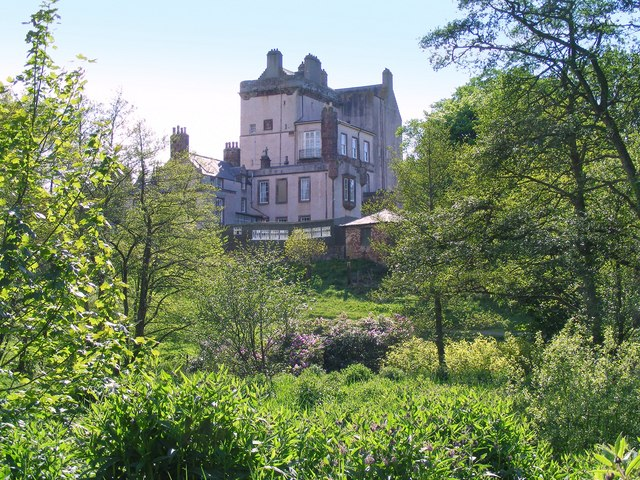
Delgatie Castle, where Mary, Queen of Scots, stayed after the Battle of Corrichie

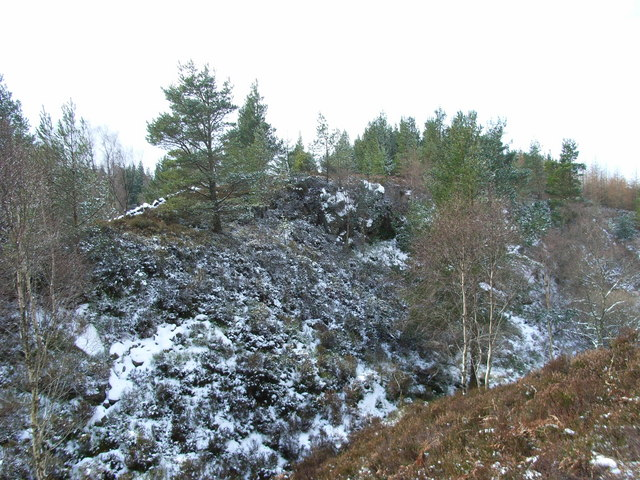
The "Queen's Chair", where according to an erroneous tradition, Mary, Queen of Scots, viewed the battlefield of Corrichie

After the battle, Huntly's eldest son Sir John Gordon was taken to Aberdeen and executed three days later. A younger brother Adam Gordon of Auchindoun, also captured at Corrichie, was spared. The Earls body was preserved and taken to Edinburgh for trial. Huntly's cousin John Gordon, 11th Earl of Sutherland, fled to Louvain in Flanders. At the Parliament of Scotland on 28 May 1563, in the presence of Queen Mary, Huntly, Sutherland, and as John Knox noted eleven other Earls and Barons of the name Gordon were forfeited. In 1565 Queen Mary of Scotland restored the Earls of Huntly, Sutherland and others of the name Gordon who had been forfeited.

The Earl of Sutherland was invited to return to Scotland. The Earl of Bedford, Governor of Berwick on Tweed, sent a privateer called Wilson who carried Swedish letters of marque to intercept his ship, and the Earl was imprisoned at Berwick. Sutherland was considered a danger to English policy in Scotland. Mary, Queen of Scots, demanded the release of the Earl, who was now sick with an ague. Bedford wrote to Elizabeth I of England on his behalf. The Earl was released in February 1566 after the assurance that he was reconciled with the Earl of Moray. On his return he married Marion Seton, daughter of Lord Seton. Both were poisoned at Helmsdale Castle by Isobel Sinclair, and died at Dunrobin Castle on 23 June 1567.
