= Jerome Frescobaldi =

Italian financier and textile merchant

Jerome, Hieronimo, or Girolamo Frescobaldi (1444–1517) was an Italian financier and textile merchant based in Bruges. He supplied luxury goods to the Scottish court and was described as a "very good friend to the King of Scots". The Frescobaldi family and company, based in Florence, were involved in artistic commissions in England and Scotland. Jerome Frescobaldi was involved in the wool trade with Tommaso Portinari and his sons, and marketed spices obtained by Portuguese traders.

== In Bruges ==
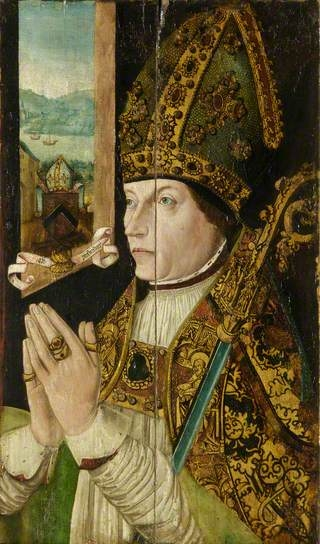
William Elphinstone, Bishop of Aberdeen, was involved with Frescobaldi and James Hommyll in purchases for the arrival of Margaret Tudor

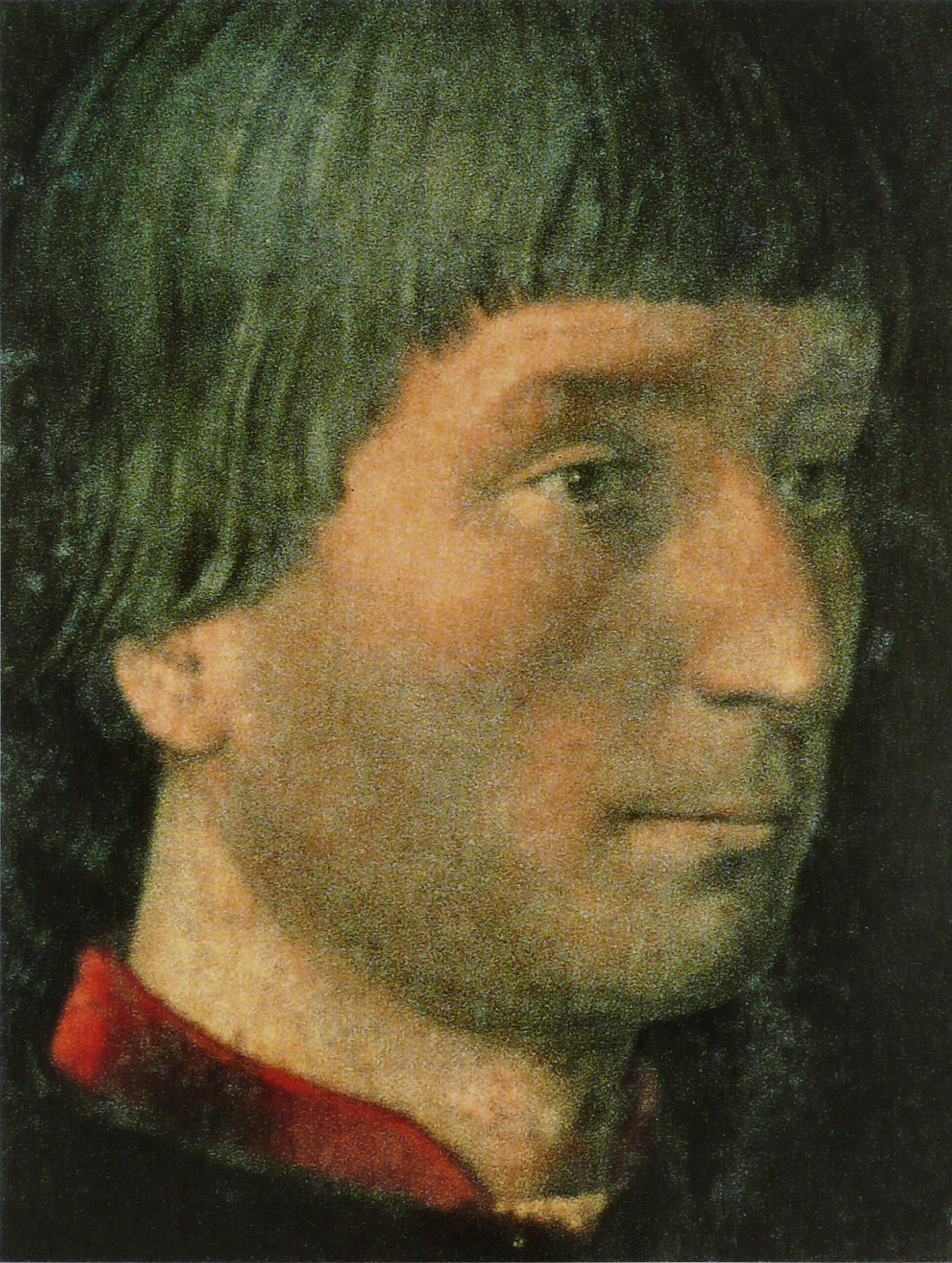
Tommaso Portinari, a business partner of Jerome Frescobaldi, detail of Portinari Triptych by Hugo van der Goes

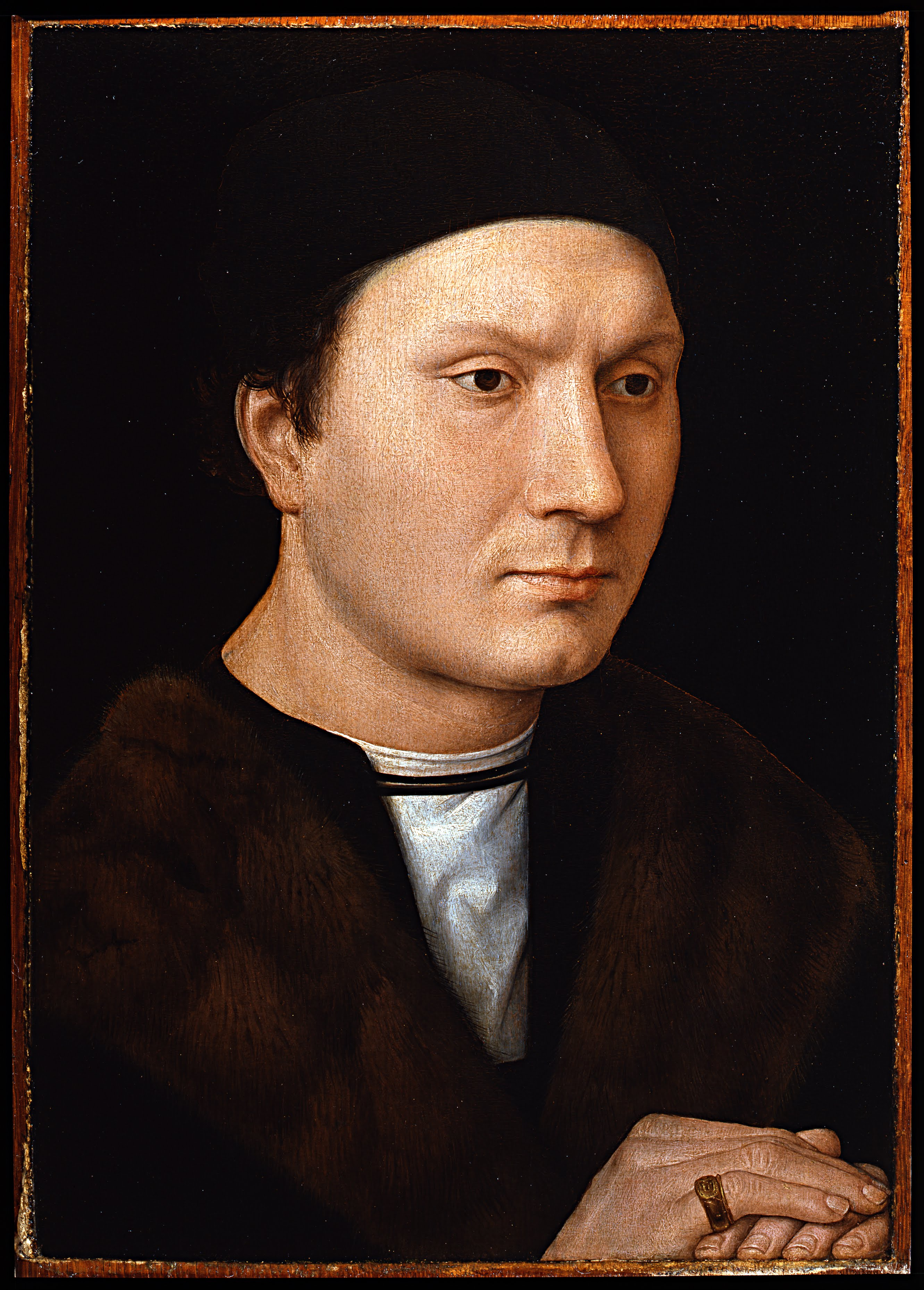
Folco Portinari, a member of the Florentine business community in Bruges, by Hans Memling

Jerome, Jeronimus, or Hieronymus (Italian: Girolamo) Frescobaldi was a member of the internationally successful Florentine Frescobaldi family, and married to Dianora Gualterotti. He was described as a "Lombard" in Scottish records. Frescobaldi and his business partners in Bruges, the Gualterotti family, sponsored the voyage of Giovanni da Empoli from Lisbon to the Malabar Coast of India in 1503 and 1504, intending that he would be their agent in Calicut for the spice trade.

Jerome Frescobaldi seems to have mostly lived in Bruges. Records survive of his transactions on behalf of the Company of Bruges (Compagni di Bruggia) concerning the wool trade and the Portinari family from 1475 onwards. In June 1493 he and Antonio Gualterotti were involved in a property transaction with a neighbour of Tommaso Portinari, a Medici banker. A list of leading Italians in Bruges in August 1498 is headed by "Hieronimo Frescobaldi", followed by the banker Cornelio Altoviti, Folco Portinari (nephew of Tommaso), Jacobo Palazzoni (factor to Bernardo Rucellai), Oberto Spinola (representative of Batista Ricardini), and Baptista Spinola.

Frescobaldi was one of a chain of bankers who held a jewel mortgaged from the Burgundian Habsburg court known as il Riccho Fiordalisio di Borgogna – the rich lily or blue bottle of Burgundy. This was a reliquary holding a fragment of the cross, a nail, and fabric from a garment of the Virgin Mary.

He established a trading house in Antwerp in 1507 in order to raise credit. He was often in Antwerp in the previous decade, and he was the Florentine consul in Antwerp in 1500. Business transactions in Antwerp and Bruges with the Scottish merchant and staple conservator Andrew Halyburton were recorded in Halyburton's ledger from 1497.

== Merchant career ==
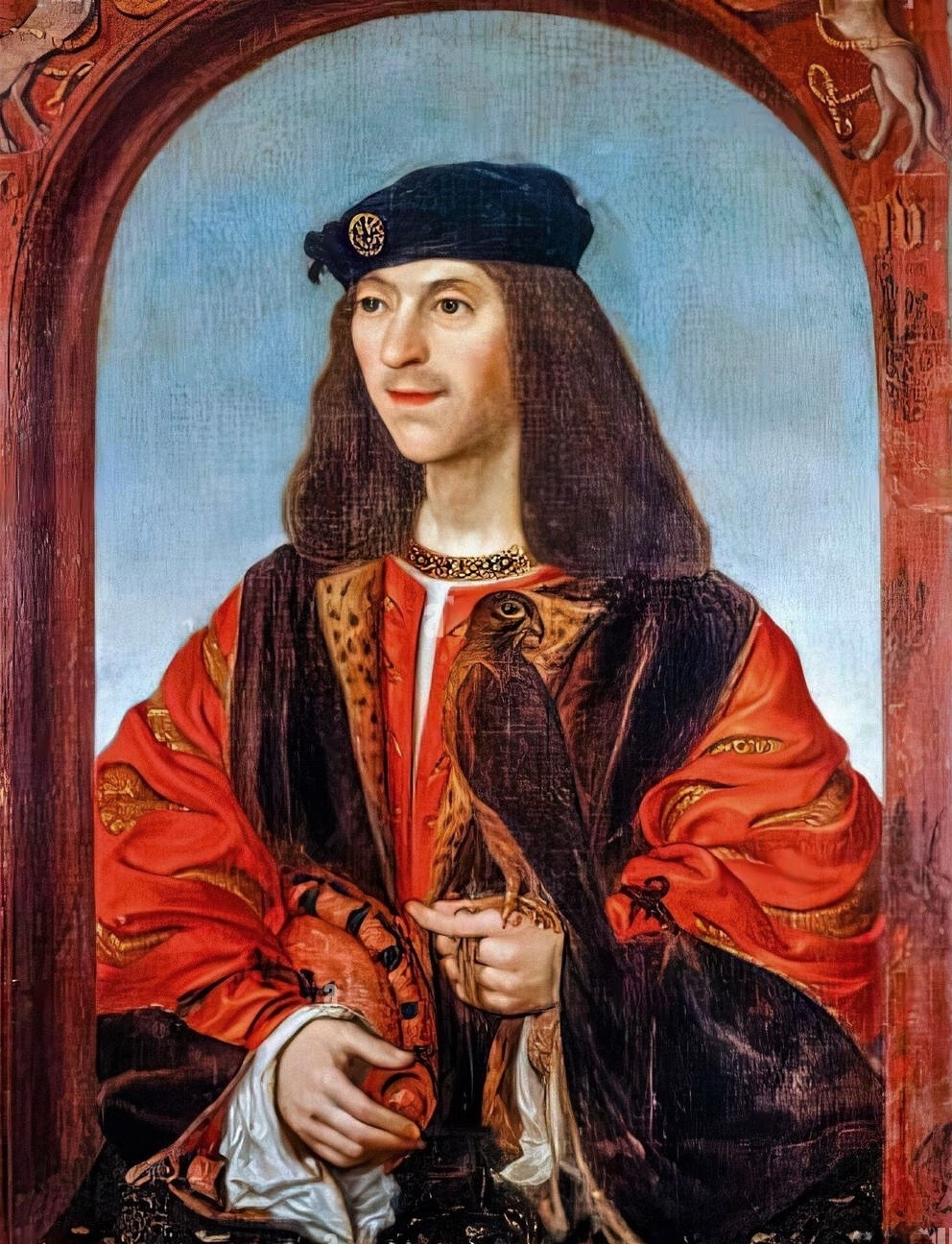
Portrait of James IV of Scotland by Daniël Mijtens after a lost original.

Frescobaldi supplied fabrics and cloth of gold used at the coronation of Henry VII of England in October 1485. The English accounts record his name as "Jarome Frustobald". The materials included "cloth of gold tissue of purple ground", "white cloth of gold" for henchmen's gowns, and crimson and green satin for doublets and placards worn by henchmen and footmen.

Frescobaldi subsequently worked to supply James IV of Scotland and his consort Margaret Tudor, and his name appears frequently in the published exchequer records and the manuscript household account. Frescobaldi arranged credit for Scottish clergy travelling in Europe, and was the factor for the foreign debts of Archbishop of St Andrews. He supplied fine textiles for costume, furnishing, and table linen. He was involved in imports from Bruges with a Scottish merchant and courtier, James Merchamestoun. Merchamestoun bought silverware and chairs of estate in 1503 for the king's marriage to Margaret Tudor, and Frescobaldi was involved with William Elphinstone, Bishop of Aberdeen, in financing these purchases. Another Scottish merchant buying in Flanders for the king at this time was James Hommyll, who imported tapestries, and hosted a group of Africans apparently including Ellen More for the king in his house on Edinburgh's High Street.

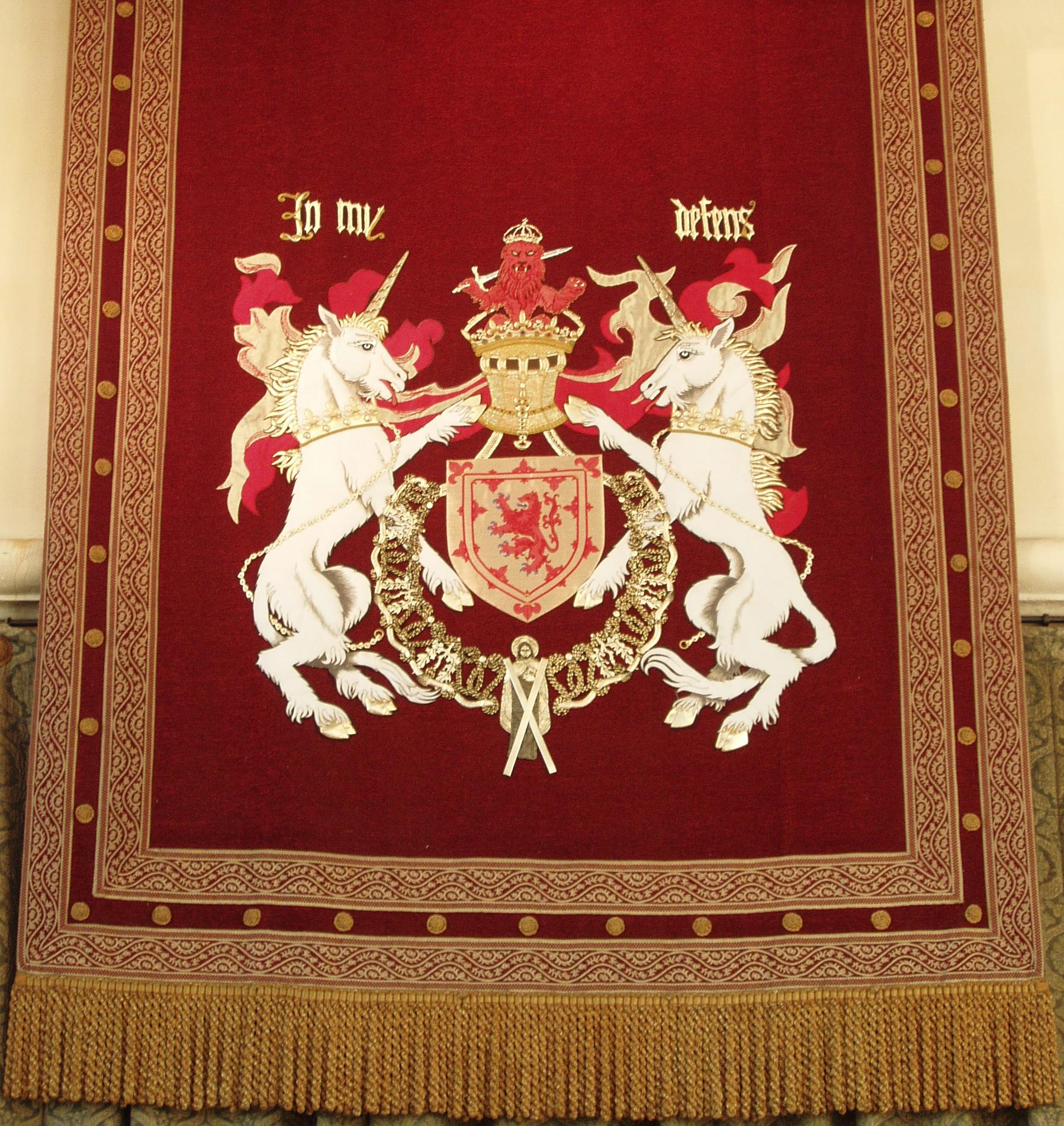
Embroidered coat of arms of James IV at Stirling Castle (modern reproduction)

In May 1503 his factor Julian Laci, also called "Julian the Lombard", was paid for purchases made in Flanders, including ermine fur for the collar of the king's gown, five chairs of estate or thrones upholstered in cloth of gold, velvet for another four chairs, and ironwork for the chairs, and 16 gilded pewter balls for the chairs. The chairs were made in Bruges and taken to Middelburg for shipping. Julian Laci also appears in the exchequer rolls, exempted from the export custom duty of Melrose wool. In May 1505, Julian Laci met with Richard Lawson of High Riggs and the burgh council of Edinburgh. He signed a deed recording that a former Provost of Edinburgh, Alexander Lauder, had returned all the goods belonging to Frescobaldi which had been in his custody.

From 1505 to 1507 Jerome Frescobaldi organised a series of purchases for James IV from a sum of Flemish money, spent in Flanders, probably in Bruges. This included a stick or length of cloth of gold, hanks of gold wire or thread, money for the purchase of great horses, books of gold leaf for illuminating manuscripts and charters, live quails and pheasants. He gave money to the king's envoys, the Carrick Pursuivant and Lyon Herald, and arranged for 1,000 gold ducats to be available in Venice for the king's son, Alexander Stewart, Archbishop of St Andrews. He arranged the payment for the Papal bulls to appoint the Archdeacon of Aberdeen, and later made payments for the controversial promotion of Gavin Douglas to the see of Dunkeld in 1516.

The cloth of gold was used to make a coat for James IV and the remaining 11 ells were given to Margaret Tudor. The gold fabric was used with expensive velvet to make an important gown in March 1507. The historian Michelle Beer argues that this gown was made for Margaret's "churching" after her first pregnancy, a ceremony which marked her return to full participation in court life. Some of the gold wire was sent to Margaret Tudor while she was away on a pilgrimage to Whithorn in June 1507.

Frescobaldi and his steward Julian Laci were not always resident in Scotland, and a note in the royal accounts from 1504 mentions that the court embroiderer Nannik, or Nanynek Dierxsoun, had used drawn gold thread sent by Frescobaldi to embroider a chasuble but there was no one to ask the price.

Frescobaldi did business with an Edinburgh merchant William Todrik. After Todrik died, Frescobaldi delivered 60 great or Flemish pounds to his executors. Todrick exported wool to Flanders.

=== The Frescobaldi family at the English court ===
Jerome Frescobaldi supplied some textiles for the coronation of Henry VII of England in 1485. His sons Filippo and Leonardo Frescobaldi conducted similar business at the English court from 1511, where there were several other Italian merchants in residence. In 1516 Leonardo Frescobaldi was given an annuity or pension by Henry VIII as a vendor of cloth of gold and silver, and he was made an usher of the king's chamber. Leonardo had stood as a guarantor for Pietro Torrigiano when he was contracted to make the tomb of Margaret Beaufort in November 1511. A Netherlandish artist involved in the tomb project, Meynnart Wewyck had been in Scotland in 1502 and 1503 painting portraits.

Leonard Frescobaldi supplied damask gold thread to the king's embroiderer John Milner. He also supplied guns and military equipment to Henry VIII, including halberds, axes and handguns, 4,500 suits of armour, cables for the king's ships, and suite of twelve cannons called the "Twelve Apostles". Some of this weaponry made have been used in France and against Scotland at the battle of Flodden. Cardinal Wolsey raised loans to pay for the armour and artillery purchases of Henry VIII from the Frescobaldi and Cavalcanti banks.

Jerome's son Francesco Frescobaldi is said to offered hospitality and employment to Thomas Cromwell in Florence around the year 1504, according to Matteo Bandello.

=== Frescobaldi and alum ===
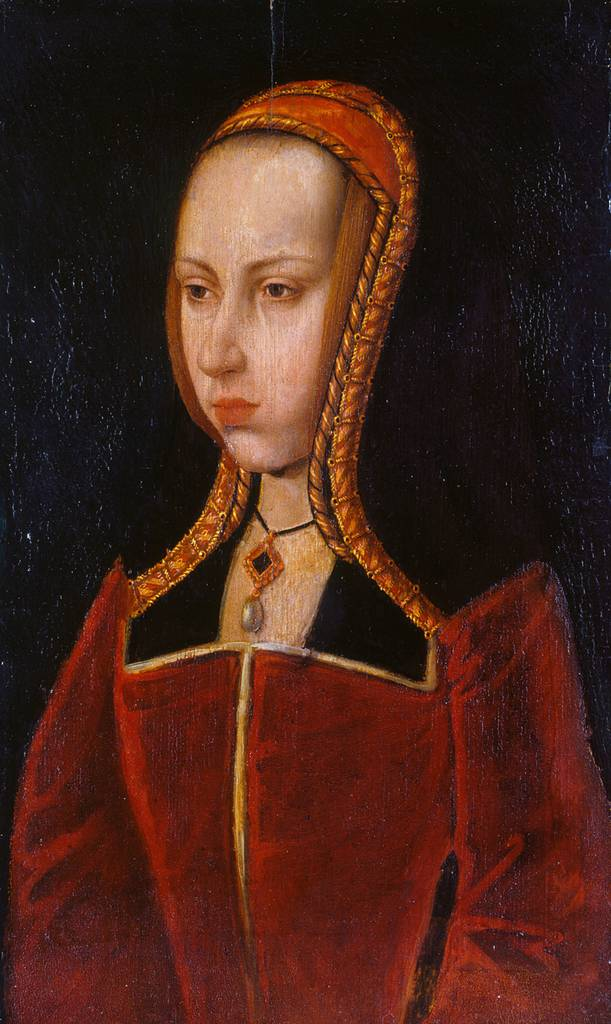
Margaret of Austria, Duchess of Savoy, lent political support to Jerome Frecobaldi, and pledged some of her jewelled tableware to him for a loan

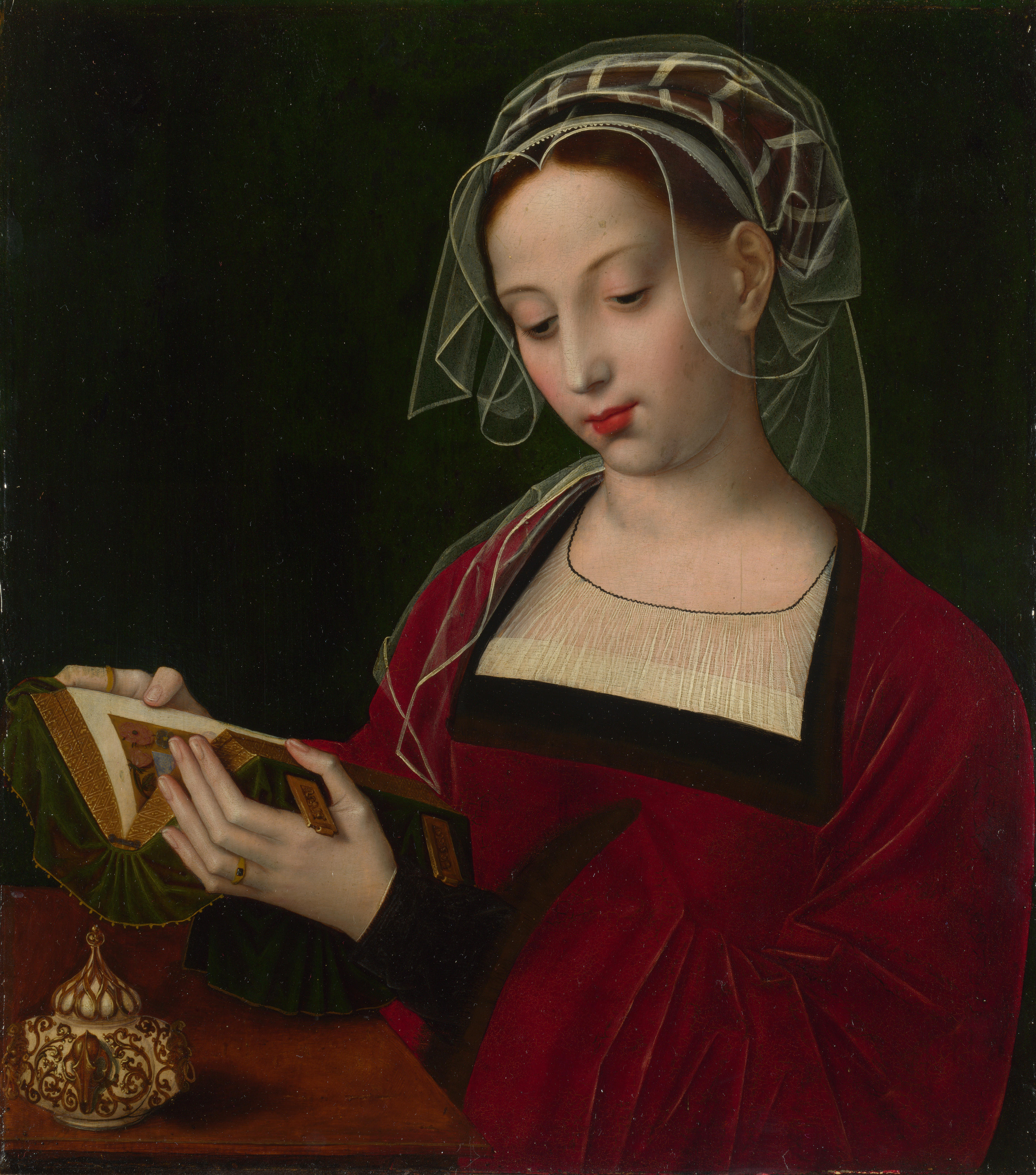
The artist Ambrosius Benson was appointed to manage the affairs of Frescobaldi's daughter, Jennette

Pope Julius II wanted to enforce a monopoly on the alum trade to increase his revenues, and in 1506 Frescobaldi's business in Bruges was among those listed as a "pernicious contagion to the souls of the faithful". Alum was essential in tanning and in cloth-dyeing as a mordant. The Frescobaldi and Gualterotti family partnership were importing Turkish alum to England and to Flanders for Philip the Handsome, resulting in a reduction in prices.

Hearing that Frescobaldi was accused of a grave charge by Pope Julius II, James IV wrote to the Pope in his favour in February 1508, mentioning that Frescobaldi had been involved in the alum trade, and Philip I of Castile had pressured him to import alum so that he broke the monopoly. In his letter, James IV wrote of Frescobaldi as his good friend and close associate. James IV wrote to Louis XII of France hoping that he too would intervene in support of Frescobaldi.

Margaret of Savoy, Governor of the Habsburg Netherlands, also wrote in his favour. Henry VII supported the Frescobaldi's role in the alum trade, contending that Julius II needed their support for a new Crusade. James IV was also enthusiastic in his letters about a crusade against Turkish shipping in the Mediterranean Sea.

=== Scottish trade to 1513 ===
In 1508 he sent more sticks of cloth of gold and arranged for the mending of some of the royal tapestries that had been burnt in a fire. The fire also damaged some of Margaret Tudor's clothes.

Frescobaldi contributed to the cost of tackle and rigging for a ship bought in Flanders. Some of the "say" fabric he sent to Scotland was used by the king's tailor Thomas Edgar to make streamers or pennants for the king's ships, including the Margaret.

In 1510 James IV wrote to the King of France, Louis XII, in Frescobaldi's favour, because rumours against him were circulating in the Papal court.

Other Italians at the Scottish court at this time included a stone mason called Cressent and a priest and alchemist John Damian. James IV gave a licence to a Florentine merchant "Lactente" Altoviti to trade in Scotland in March 1513.

In 1513, the Bishop of Caithness, who managed the royal households and fishings, sent Frescobaldi barrels of salmon which were exempted from customs duty. Frescobaldi is mentioned as a supplier in the royal household account book kept by the Bishop.

== Death ==
After the death of Jerome Frescobaldi in 1517, in May 1518 his five sons Leonard, Francesco, Jehan, Pierre, and Philippe Frescobaldi took charge of his business in Bruges. The business in Antwerp collapsed in the same year. His sons were helped by Cardinal Campeggio and Cardinal Wolsey to refound the business as Leonard Frescobaldi and Company.

== Artistic connections ==
Frescobaldi loaned money to Margaret of Austria, Duchess of Savoy, Governor of the Netherlands, on an inventory of some of her jewelled tableware, which he returned to her. The pieces were weighed and valued by the goldsmith Lieven van Lathem, a son of the painter Lieven van Lathem.

Frescobaldi supplied artists' materials to the Scottish court. Colours for painting sent from Flanders in 1508 cost the relatively large sum of £31 Scots. They may have been for a painter called "Piers" in the accounts, who has been tentatively identified as Peerken Bovelant, an apprentice of an Antwerp painter Goswijn van der Weyden, who joined St Luke's guild in Antwerp in 1503. Goswijn van der Weyden is thought to have supplied paintings to Henry VIII and Catherine of Aragon.

Piers was brought to Scotland in September 1505 by Andrew Halyburton, the trading agent or "Conservator of Scottish Privileges" in Middelburg. No details are known of his work, except his assistance in painting costumes and heraldry for tournaments including the Wild Knight and the Black Lady. James Homyll provided him with gold leaf. Piers cut out letters or ciphers to decorate the bards of the king's horses from velvet and the cloth of gold supplied by Frescobaldi. The king gave him a salary and accommodation, and it is likely that Piers made portraits for the court. A portrait of James IV wearing a collar of St George dated 1507 survives at Abbotsford. Piers returned to Flanders from Inverkeithing in July 1508.

His family also developed artistic connections in the Netherlands. In 1530 the painter Ambrosius Benson and a Spanish apothecary called Arigon were appointed to look after the affairs of his daughter Johanna or Jennette Frescobaldi. She married Guyot de Beaugrant. He was a sculptor in alabaster from the Duchy of Lorraine who worked for Margaret of Austria in Brussels and carved the story of Susannah and the Elders on a fireplace in the administration building of the "Liberty of Bruges" or Brugse Vrije, following the designs of Lancelot Blondeel. They moved to Spain in 1533.
