= Frescobaldi (disambiguation) =

Frescobaldi may refer to:

- Frescobaldi – a prominent family from Italy
- Girolamo Frescobaldi – the Italian Baroque composer
- Jerome Frescobaldi (died 1517), Italian merchant based in Bruges who supplied James IV of Scotland
- Leonardo Frescobaldi – 16th-century Italian merchant in England
- Pietro Frescobaldi (died 1654), Bishop of San Miniato
- Frescobaldi (software) – music notation software for editing LilyPond format
