= Andrew Halyburton =

Scottish merchant

Andrew Halyburton or Haliburton (before 1490 – 1507) was a Scottish merchant.

== Conservator of Scottish trading privileges ==
Andrew Halyburton was stationed at Middelburg in Flanders where he was 'Conservator of the Scottish Staple,' or 'Conservator of the Scottish privileges in the Low Countries.' A surviving letter in French calls him, 'Conservateur de la Nasion des Eschosoys a Midelburg.' This consular role administered to the Scottish import and export trade with the county of Flanders. However, few official Scottish or Flemish records of Andrew's administration survive. In two letters to the town of Middelburg James IV of Scotland called Andrew 'our merchant' and 'the King's familiar servant,' and 'privilegiorum nationis in istis terris conservator,' - conservator of our nation's privileges in your lands. The letters reminded the council of Middelburg of Andrew's jurisdictions over Scottish trade issues, and how he should speak in their courts on behalf of Scottish sailors and captains.

One of Andrew's ledgers survives in which he recorded a series of accounts he opened with Scottish clients who sent money and goods to him in Flanders, often to fund special purchases. Some of the cargoes were carried in the ships of Andrew Barton of Leith. Halyburton's ledger provides evidence on the exchange rates for the gold and silver coins used in international trade. Primarily, Andrew's clients sent him wool or skins to sell. A letter from Andrew to a Scottish client survived with the ledger, advising hides would sell best at Eastertide 1502; he wrote,

"Thar standis yet ii sekkis of woll of youris unsauld, and quhen thai are sauld, I shall send you your reckoning of all things between us. ... Please you to wit that here is an evil mercat, sa help me God, except your woll, ... Hydis, I trow, shall be the best merchandise that come here at Pasche, for thar is many folkis that speris (ask) about thaim"

(modernised) There stands yet 2 sacks of wool of yours unsold, and when they are sold, I shall send you your reckoning of all things between us. ... Please you to know that here is an evil market, so help me God, except your wool, ... Hides (skins), I believe, shall be the best merchandise that come here at Eastertide, for there is many folk that ask for them

Halyburton's account for James Stewart, Duke of Ross and Archbishop of St Andrews, includes a payment in September 1497 apparently for letters sent to Margaret of York from Perkin Warbeck and his wife, Lady Catherine Gordon, who was known as the White Rose, "Item, gyffyn Davy Rattrye quhen he passed to (blank) with the quhit ros lettrys to my lady, 10 shillings."

The Duke of Ross sent money to Halyburton, which he banked with Cornelis Altanitis in Bruges, the money was to be paid out in Rome to purchase Papal Bulls. Halyburton also commissioned two carved stone tomb sculptures for the Duke, which he called 'throwchts.' Andrew sent the stones to Veere in a barge he called a Schout, from where they were shipped to Scotland.

Halyburton paid money to the Italian merchant and financier Jerome Frescobaldi, in Antwerp and Bruges, on behalf of his clients and business partners. Frescobaldi supplied luxury goods to the Royal Court of Scotland.

In Edinburgh, the churchman and lawyer Patrick Paniter acted on Andrew's behalf, enforcing the payment of rent at Andrew's house on the Royal Mile near the Mercat cross in May 1506. Andrew was described as an 'agent in Flanders.' On 31 December 1507, James IV appointed John Francis as 'Conservator of the Privileges in Flanders, Brabant, Zeeland, and Holland', to replace Andrew, who had died.

== Artists and artists' materials ==
Andrew Halyburton bought painting materials in Antwerp for an Edinburgh merchant, Thomas Cant, in June 1497. Thomas Cant had sold cloth, clothes, and hats to the royal wardrobe since 1474, and Master John Cant, probably his son, bought a Mass book for Margaret of Denmark, Queen of Scotland. The painting materials included gold and silver leaf, vermilion, red lead and white lead.

In September 1505 Halyburton hired a Flemish painter, 'Piers', to come to Scotland and work for James IV. This was possibly Peerken Bovelant, an apprentice of Goswijn van der Weyden in Antwerp, who joined the Guild of St Luke in 1503. Few details are known of Piers' work, except his assistance in painting costumes and heraldry for tournaments, but the King gave him a salary and accommodation, and it is likely that Piers made portraits for the court. Piers worked on banners for the tournament of the Wild Knight and the Black Lady and banners for the Edinburgh Hammermen craft.

== Family and artistic connections ==
Andrew Halyburton married Cornelia Bening, the daughter of a Flemish painter, Sanders Bening (1448–1519) member of the guilds of Ghent and Bruges, (their niece Levina Teerlinc (fl. 1545–1567) painted at the court of Henry VIII of England). Cornelia Bening's mother Katheline was a daughter (or sister or niece) of Hugo van der Goes (d. 1482), who had painted an altarpiece for Edinburgh's Trinity College Kirk.

Cornelia's younger brothers were the painters Simon Bening (1483–1561) father of Levina, and Paul Bening. It has been tentatively suggested that the painters in Scotland called 'Binning' during the sixteenth century were connections of the Flemish Bening family.

Andrew Halyburton and Cornelia's children included a son Thomas and a daughter Cornelias.

Andrew Halyburton was well-connected in the close-knit society of Edinburgh merchants. His sister Helen Halyburton was married to Laurence Taillefer who was joint 'Customar of Edinburgh' with Andrew Moubray senior. The role of the Customar was to collect trade taxes in Edinburgh for the crown. Helen Halyburton had previously married a member of the Mossman family, and had a son, Sandy Mossman.

Andrew Moubray senior was married to a Jonet Halyburton, who was perhaps Helen and Andrew's eldest sister. Jonet's brothers James and David Halyburton served in the Garde Écossaise. In his ledger, Andrew Halyburton described a trading colleague, William Hoppar, the brother of Isobel Hoppar and father of the younger Andrew Moubray's wife Katrine, as his 'gossop,' a Scots word meaning relative. He called an associate, the Edinburgh textile merchant James Hommyll, his "brother".

== Death ==
Andrew Halyburton died in 1507. His house on the north side of the Royal Mile was granted to John Mossman, as attorney of Andrew's son, Thomas Haliburton. The 'sasine' of this transaction was disputed by a neighbor John Knollis. Thomas was dead by 1534, and his sister Cornelia was his heir.
