= John Steel (tailor) =

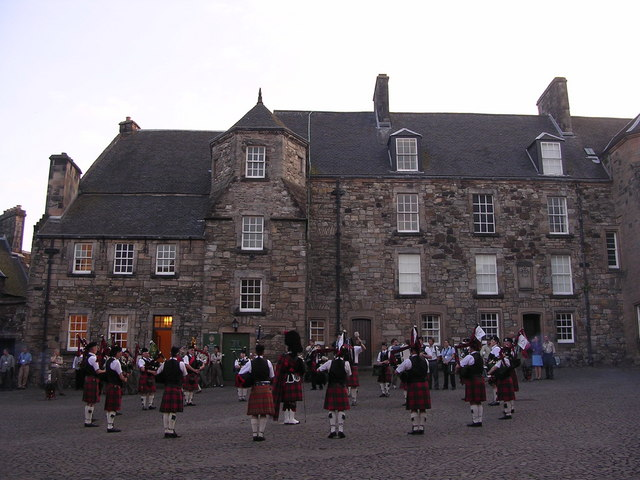
John Steel and his workmen made wallhangings for rooms at Stirling Castle

John Steel was a Scottish tailor based in Edinburgh. He worked for King James IV in the 1490s and 1500s.

== Working for the Scottish court ==
John Steel was member of the royal household and was paid a fee and given livery clothes. In 1494, he used reindeer hide to cover a "jack" (a coat armoured with steel plates). In August 1495, he made the king a white riding coat to wear while hunting. Steel made gowns worn by king, including one "of the new fashion to the knee".

Steel travelled to Melrose with clothes for James IV at Christmas 1496, and in January packed the king's bed into a bag. Steel had an assistant, "his man", who brought a new pair of hose and other items to the king.

=== Interior decoration ===
In June 1501, at the completion of the border of a hanging or tapestry with scarlet cloth, James IV gave Steel's junior workmen, his "childir", a drinksilver tip of 14 shillings. Steel and other tailors shared a reward of £5 Scots for making these scarlet and damask hangings for the chambers at Stirling Castle.

=== Royal wedding ===
The royal treasurer's accounts mention that John Steel's wife wove 7 ells of silk fringes for a bed for James IV at the time of his wedding in 1503 to Margaret Tudor, but her name was not recorded. At the same time, other fringes used on Margaret's great bed of estate were imported from Flanders by James Hommyll. Steel received a gift of £10 Scots as a reward for his "great labours" in preparation for the royal marriage, and his servant tailors received drinksilver for works at the reception of the queen.
