= William Betoun =

William Betoun or Beaton (died 1620) was a Scottish embroiderer who worked for James VI of Scotland and his wife and queen consort, Anne of Denmark.

On 25 July 1573 Regent Morton appointed Betoun as "browdinstar" to the young king and keeper of his wardrobe. At this time James VI lived at Stirling Castle. Betoun acquired a house in Stirling.

In 1575 Betoun had a servant or assistant embroiderer called George Strathauchin, who was bought clothes by the treasurer. Strathauchin became a "tapissier", in charge of maintaining and repairing the royal hangings and tapestries. Betoun received the same annual fee or salary as John Murdo, the tailor in the royal wardrobe.

At the direction of James VI, Beaton was made a burgess and guild brother of Edinburgh in April 1579. In October 1580, Betoun was paid for a number of items supplied to James VI, including a bed, hooks for hanging tapestry during a progress, curtains for a green bed, and a sumpter cloth. Betoun also worked for aristocratic clients, including Lady Ogilvy. He made her a hat string costing £40 Scots to wear at her son's wedding.

He married Marion Foulis in August 1597. William Betoun died in July 1620.

== Embroidery and the baptism of Prince Henry ==
James VI had a suite of three green velvet hangings, possibly those embroidered with gold holly leaves and the Longueville arms mentioned in earlier inventories, which had belonged to his grandmother Mary of Guise (as Duchess of Longueville by her first marriage). Green hangings were delivered to George Strathauchin for repair in 1594 to be displayed at the baptism of Prince Henry. These hangings were repaired by Nicolas Elsmeere for use during James' return visit to Scotland in 1617. Betoun is known to have made coloured velvet cloths to decorate and identify the ambassador's seats in the Chapel Royal during the baptism, and made bonnets for Prince Henry of cloth of gold and cloth of silver.
