= Scottish royal tapestry collection =

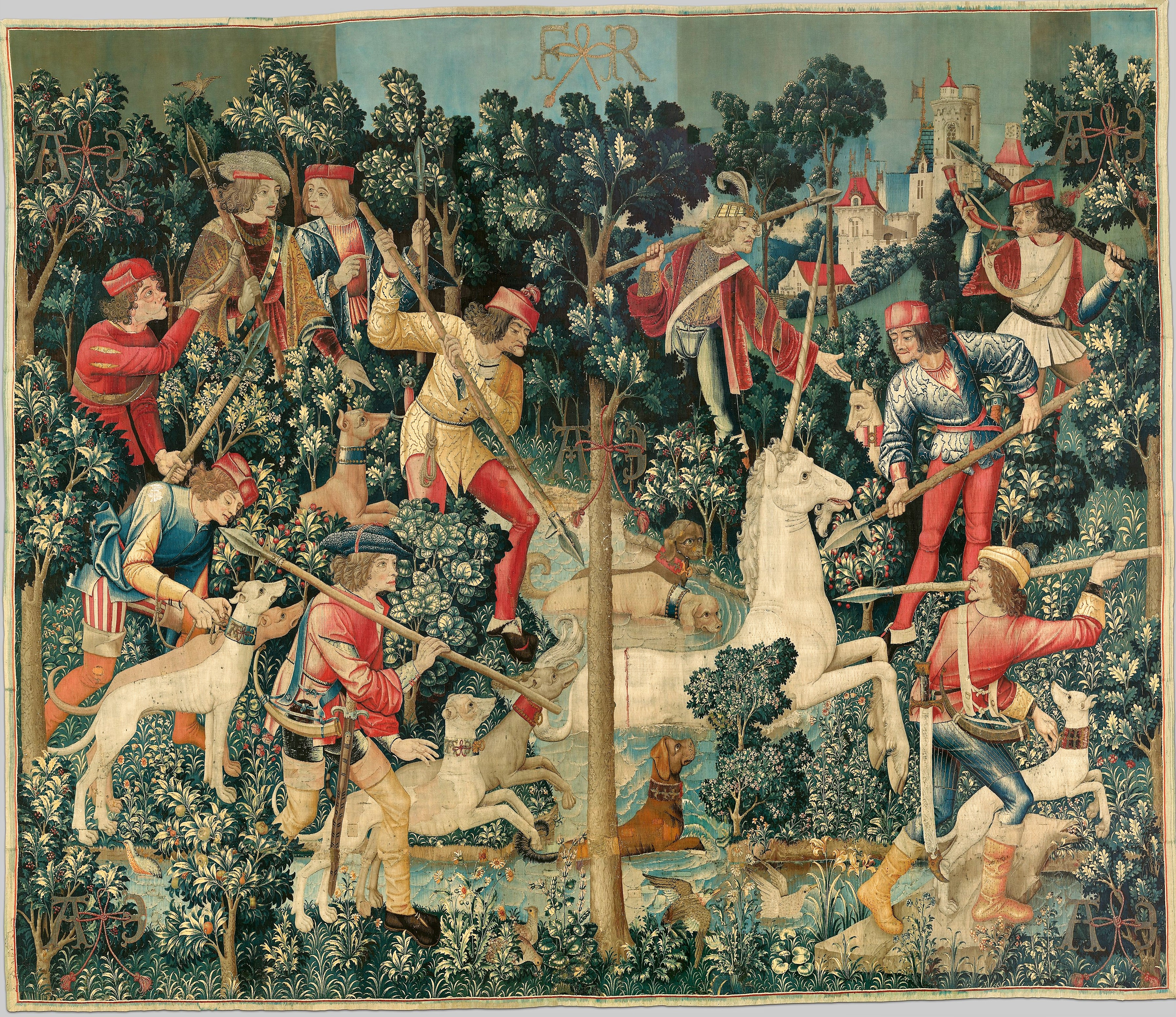
Scene from The Hunt of the Unicorn. Metropolitan Museum of Art, New York

The Scottish royal tapestry collection was a group of tapestry hangings assembled to decorate the palaces of sixteenth-century kings and queens of Scotland. None appear to have survived.

== Tapestry at the Royal Court of Scotland ==
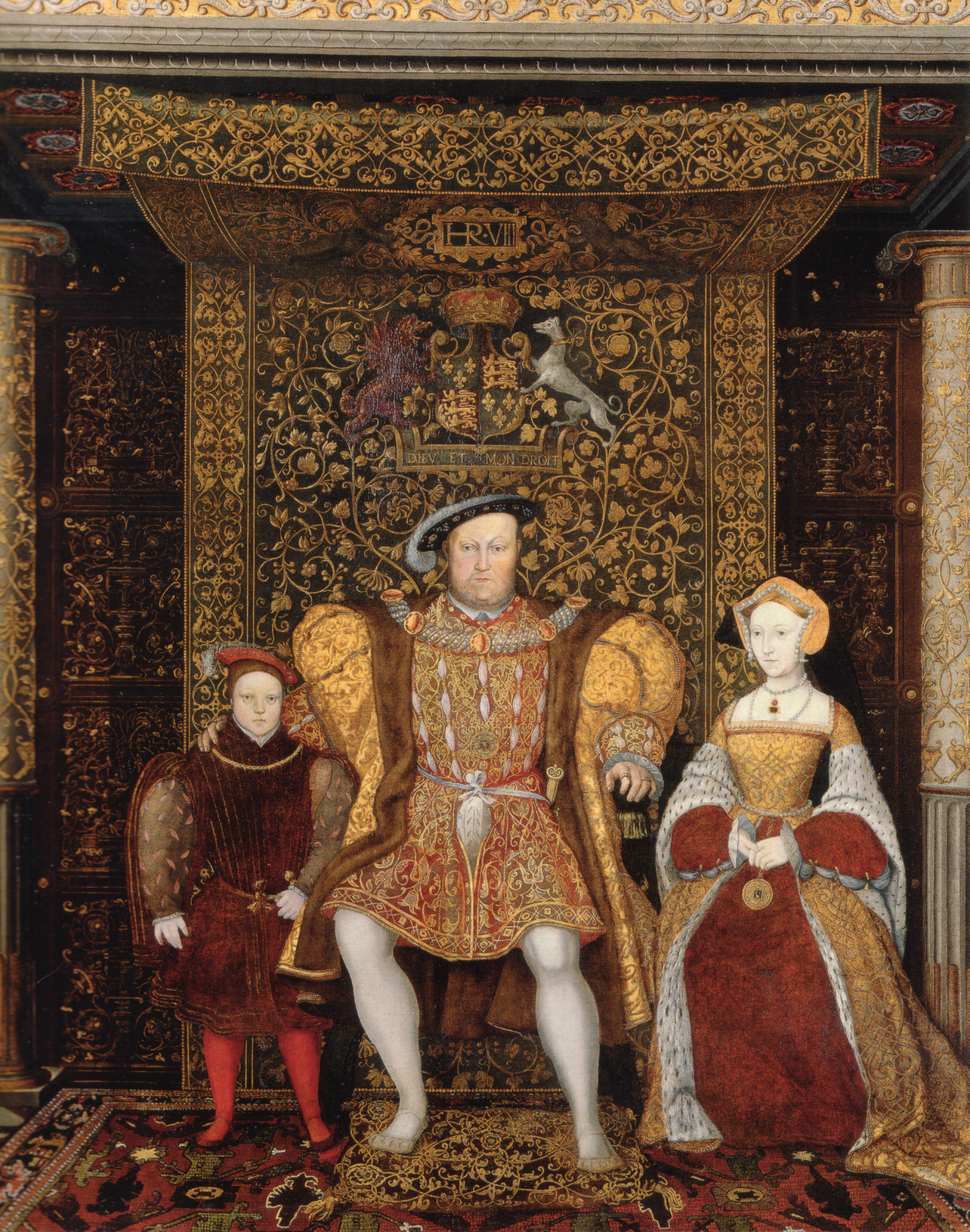
Henry VIII seated beneath a tapestry cloth of state

Like other European monarchs, the kings and queens of Scotland sought to impress their subjects and diplomatic visitors in costly surroundings. At Château de Fontainebleau in 1540, the King of France himself helped the English ambassador onto a bench so he could examine and admire the 'antique borders' of the tapestry in his bedchamber, and this was seen as a sign of special favour. In Scotland, James V's tapestries were listed in two inventories, along with the crown jewels and fine clothes. These tapestries were used to hang the best chambers and halls in the palaces, and were transported with the monarch between residences and lined, fixed and hung by specialists on the court pay-roll. The rooms were decorated with a painted frieze at the top of the wall and plain beneath where the tapestries hung. In England, Henry VIII had nearly 2000 tapestries and James V had 200.

Eleven pieces of royal tapestry were destroyed in the explosion at Kirk o' Field in February 1567 that killed the King Consort of Scotland, Henry Stuart, Lord Darnley. The names of many others were recorded, and the subjects are the same as those listed in other royal collections, and some examples survive in museums around the world. Some of the tapestries showed Biblical themes, or subjects with medieval roots, but most were stories from classical antiquity, reflecting Renaissance taste, and some were scenes from the hunting field.

== Tapestry and the court of James IV ==
James IV owned tapestries, which are usually called the "arras" in records of his court, because the city of Arras, now in France, had been a centre of tapestry-weaving. The tapestries were frequently carried between the palaces as the royal family moved. The tapestry was also deployed to impress foreign diplomats. In January 1495, tapestries were put in the king's chamber at Holyrood Palace in Edinburgh for the visit of the Chancellor of Denmark by James Dog. He was a wardrobe servant and was described in two poems by William Dunbar, Of James Dog and He Is Na Dog, He Is a Lam. Soon after, the tapestries were packed up and taken to Stirling Castle, where the king celebrated Easter. In November 1495, the King's cupboard, tapestries, and chapel goods were carted from Edinburgh to Stirling for the reception of Perkin Warbeck.

Ripped and torn tapestries were mended in 1497 by a priest John Kilgour of Dunblane. In March 1498, James IV ordered a suite of tapestry for his lodging at Stirling Castle from James Makysone, a merchant based in Leith. In 1501, new hangings of damask and scarlet cloth were made for chambers at Stirling by John Steel and his workmen.

== The reception of Margaret Tudor at Holyroodhouse ==
In preparation for the arrival of his bride Margaret Tudor at Holyroodhouse on 8 August 1503, James IV bought new tapestries. A group was bought from a merchant called James Hommyll, who imported textiles from Flanders, which cost £160 Scots. These were a piece with the subject of Hercules, two pieces of Susanna sewn together, a Susanna bed cover, a Solomon, and a Marcus Coriolanus. The total measurement which, combined with quality, dictated the price, was 209 square ells. The tapestries were lined with canvas. A set of six verdure tapestries were bought for hanging in the gallery and on the stairs, each costing £3. Five other smaller verdures of various sizes cost £11-4s. Ten fine verdures were bought from John Stewart; three with 'beasts' cost £4-10s each, seven with no beasts cost £4 each (the 'beasts' may have been unicorns). Four other verdures bought for beds were in quality, 'nocht sa gude', and cost only 40 shillings each.

Before Margaret left England, the tapestry agent of Henry VII of England, Cornelius van der Strete, had been paid £7-8s (English money) for making or supplying 74 Flemish ells of tapestry for the Scottish Consort Queen. The historian and curator Thomas P. Campbell suggests these may have been simple armorial tapestries or borders to be attached to figural tapestries purchased elsewhere.

James Dog fixed hooks in the rooms of Holyrood Palace for tapestry. The English Somerset Herald, John Young, described some of the tapestry at Holyroodhouse on the two days of celebration. Young noted the hangings in the two outer rooms of the King and Queen's suites where meals were served. The Queen's hall was hung with the History of Hercules, and her great chamber with the History of Troy Town. The King's hall was hung with the History of Old Troy, and his great chamber with Hercules and other stories. Possibly some of these tapestries were brought to Scotland by Margaret, perhaps with new borders including Tudor heraldry supplied by Cornelis van der Strete.

The royal treasurer's accounts record payments for carrying tapestry between the palaces: six dozen hooks were bought for hangings in the new Great Hall of Stirling Castle in November 1503; in February 1506, the 'Cloths of Hercules' were taken from Edinburgh to Linlithgow Palace. There was a fire in October 1506 and burnt tapestries were packed in barrels and taken to Leith. The Italian merchant Jerome Frescobaldi, who was based in Bruges, made arrangements for their repair in Flanders. The merchant James Hommyl hosted the king's African servants including Ellen More in the winter of 1504.

== Tapestry inventories ==
=== James V ===
Two inventories of 1539 and 1543 list the tapestries of James V. Some of these had belonged to James IV, though Gavin Douglas said that Regent Albany had cut up royal crimson and purple hangings to make clothes for his servants and pages, but many were bought by James V, or were presents from Francis I of France on his marriage to Madeleine of Valois. A 1532 contract for the making of a tapestry altar frontal for James V by François van Cralotte of Bruges survives in the National Library of Scotland.

An inventory of September 1561 made by Servais de Condé lists tapestries and other hangings belonging to Mary of Guise, and another compiled on 25 November lists Mary, Queen of Scots' collection. These lists have marginal notes describing the later locations of the tapestries. Mary Queen of Scots added to the royal collection by confiscating 45 tapestries belonging to the Earl of Huntly at Huntly Castle in October 1562. These included one set of large leaf verdures and other set with leaves and birds. Five of the eleven tapestries destroyed at Kirk o' Field were from Huntly, the other were from a suite depicting a "Rabbit Hunt".

=== Regent Moray and Mary's goods ===
After the battle of Langside in May 1568, the Regent Moray took back from Hamilton Palace rich silk tapestry and beds that had belonging to James V. Packing canvas bought for goods seized from the castle at Hamilton (Cadzow Castle), including some of the royal tapestries. Packages and trunks from Hamilton were carried to Edinburgh by horses supervised by the gunner Harry Balfour. Mary had loaned some tapestry and furnishings to James Sandilands, 1st Lord Torphichen, which had been taken to Hamilton. Later, he was questioned about these items, he said that Servais de Condé had received, "so many books, and such moveables, which were all dispersed, dimembered, and spoilt by the soldiers, and [by] harling them on sleds through the foul moors and taking no accompt of the keeping of them when they were in Hamilton".

Possibly Regent Moray and his agent Nicolas Elphinstone sold tapestries abroad in 1568 along with Mary's pearls, selected royal jewels, and a so-called unicorn horn. Mary, now a prisoner in England, complained in August 1570 that Scottish ships had brought items of her 'apparel, costly hangings, and jewels' to Hull and other English ports for sale.

=== At Stirling Castle ===
An inventory of March 1579 made by George Douglas of Parkhead lists tapestries stored in Edinburgh Castle and those hanging at Stirling Castle, where James VI was resident. Tapestries at Stirling included eight pieces of the Judgement of Paris, four pieces of the Hunt of the Unicorn, four or five pieces of Roboam, five pieces of the "Triumph of Verity", four pieces of the Count of Ravenna, four pieces of the History of Aeneas, a piece of the Story of Tobit, and a hanging with the arms of the Dukes of Longueville. Other furnishings in use at Stirling at this time include a cloth of estate made of alternate strips of gold and crimson velvet, a cloth of estate of "high colour" crimson velvet, a crimson satin cloth of estate, and a cloth of estate of cloth of gold. These cloths of estate were suspended above the chairs and thrones used by James VI. There were three state beds; one of red velvet embroidered with love knots and a "I.I" motif, another bed of cloth of gold and silver embroidered with pots of flowers, and another of "high colour" crimson velvet. These beds and cloths of estate were positioned in the three principal rooms of the king's royal lodging.

Some of the tapestries then displayed in Stirling Castle may have been in place for decades, others had recently been storage in Edinburgh Castle with Mary's goods. In June 1578 "certain great pieces of tapestry" and coffers of furnishings were loaded on a boat at Leith and shipped to Cambuskenneth and the castle.

An inventory of Stirling Castle made on 6 May 1584 records a set of five tapestries hanging in the king's audience chamber in the palace with the red damask or satin "dais" cloth, and seven tapestries in the bedchamber with cloth of estate of gold and the red velvet bed. The other furnishings used in the king's minority years at Stirling were probably taken to Holyroodhouse.

=== Mary, Queen of Scots in England ===
When Mary was moved to Tutbury Castle in February 1569, three suites of tapestries and carpets were delivered from the Removing Wardrobe at the Tower of London to furnish her rooms. These included six pieces of the Passion, six pieces of the History of Ladies, and seven pieces of Hercules; the latter two subjects are found in the earlier Scottish inventories. At Sheffield Manor in February 1577 she had her own tapestries of Aeneas and Meleager. In January 1585, when Mary was again being moved to Tutbury, Queen Elizabeth recalled that Regent Moray had sent plate, hangings and other items to Mary while she was in the custody of the Earl of Shrewsbury. The Earl wrote (to Lord Burghley) that this was not the case and Elizabeth was mistaken: "to my knowledge since her commynge she never received any stuff or other things from him."

Mary used tapestry to line her bedchamber at Tutbury against the cold, making a kind of tent. Her requests caused some confusion in the correspondence of John Somers and William Cecil. At Fotheringhay in 1587 she had six pieces of Meleager and six of the Battle of Ravenna which she wished to be sold to pay for her servants' journeys home.

=== James VI and Anna of Denmark ===
Tapestries and hangings were carefully repaired in 1594 for the baptism of Prince Henry at Stirling Castle. In 1595, an exchequer official John Skene noted the expense of transporting and repairing tapestry. He suggested that money could be saved by keeping tapestries in each residence rather than carting them around and causing damage, noting:

becaus the cariage of tapistrie is not onlie costlie bot alsua it weiris and spillis (wears and spoils) the same, thairfoir it is very necessar to let sameikle (so much) of the said tapistrie be put in cofferis and remane within everie ane of the saidis palices as wilbe meitest for hinging the wallis thairof.

After the Union of the Crowns, King James inherited the tapestries belonging to the English crown, and bought new tapestries from merchants and manufacturers, including Francis Spiring, or Spierincx of Delft (1550-1630) who supplied a suite of three or five pieces for £251-10s sterling in September 1607.

In October 1615 King James ordered John Auchmoutie, keeper of the royal wardrobe in Scotland, to provide tapestry to Lord Erskine to furnish two rooms in Stirling Castle. Some tapestries remained at Dunfermline Palace in 1616, where Alexander Seton, 1st Earl of Dunfermline, had looked after the infant Prince Charles. There was also tapestry at Linlithgow Palace which had furnished a bedchamber for Prince Henry. It had been cut through by the fool Andrew Cockburn. The Earl of Linlithgow had provided tapestry for Princess Elizabeth's rooms.

Among the remaining contents of the Royal Wardrobe at Holyroodhouse in 1617, three pieces of green velvet embroidered with gold holly leaves and the Longueville arms, which had belonged to Mary of Guise (Duchess of Longueville by her first marriage), were repaired by Nicolas Elsmeere for use during James's return visit to Scotland. These Longueville hangings may have been repaired in 1594 by the embroiderer William Betoun for the baptism of Prince Henry. In 1635, Charles I wrote to John Stewart, 1st Earl of Traquair, Treasurer of Scotland, insisting on the payment of the wardrobe servants, so that hangings, cloths-of-estate, and beds could be aired. The remaining tapestries at Holyrood would have been seized by Commonwealth troops in 1650. In April 1656, soldiers retrieved and sent to Whitehall four pieces of the Labours of Hercules, perhaps the latest mention of tapestry from the Scottish royal collection.

== The tapestry collection ==
=== Bought in Paris ===
The six pieces of the Triumphant Dames or City of Dames were bought in Paris in 1537 or 1538 for 883 francs 10 sous during James V's trip to marry Madeleine of Valois. The pieces varied slightly in size with a total area of 147 square ells, each square ell costed at six francs, to a total of 883 francs 10 sou. The set was finished with canvas, cords, and ribbons, and sent to Rouen by boat and then to Newhaven in France for shipping, along with another set called the Old and New Stories. The area of the tapestry which "covers both the stories" was 250 square ells, at 5 francs 10 sou the ell, and cost 1,375 francs. The cost of a new tapestry per unit area is probably a good indication of quality.

The Scottish suite was probably the ten-piece Old Testament listed in the inventory of 1539. Only one piece was noted in 1542, and none was heard of again in Scotland. A set with a similar name, the New Law and the Old, was listed among Catherine of Aragon's effects in February 1536. The English "Old and New Law" tapestries were a subject now usually known as the "Redemption of Man". A set of eleven pieces may have been bought by Henry VII. Wolsey bought another set for Hampton Court. The Earl of Sussex had six pieces of a set of "Old Law and New Law" at Newhall in 1583. Two pieces from a set of the Old and New Law were in the wardrobe of Hampton Court in 1658, taken down from the queen's privy chamber and another nine pieces were listed the king's privy chamber.

James V's servant George Steill was sent to Flanders from Paris on 3 February 1537 to acquire more tapestries. At the same time James V hired a new French tapestry-man, William, and gave him 20 crowns to bring his wife and children to Scotland.

When Mary, Queen of Scots was a prisoner at Tutbury Castle, six pieces of series called the History of Ladies were sent from the Tower of London. This was probably one of three sets of the City of Ladies that had belonged to Henry VIII, listed in the inventory of 1547, which were identical in size piece by piece to the Scottish tapestries. These had decorated the childhood homes of Princess Elizabeth and Prince Edward. The subject derives from Christine de Pizan's The Book of the City of Ladies. Other sets of this subject belonged to Margaret of Austria, Mary of Hungary, Anne of Brittany and Francis I.

The other tapestry bought in Paris and packed for shipping to Rouen was the Creation of World, of which nine pieces were at Holyroodhouse in 1561, and in Edinburgh Castle in 1578. In 1616, Alexander Seton had some 'auld and worne' pieces described as the Storie of Mankynd at Dunfermline Palace. The set could possibly have been The World series, depicting various moral allegories and including a globe. There was a set of the History of the Creation of the World at Hampton Court in 1613, in which God was represented as three persons in bishop's costumes with crowns and sceptres. This could have been a design known as the Redemption of Man known to have been owned both by Henry VIII and Cardinal Thomas Wolsey. There were several weavings.

A list of wedding gifts from Francis I adds four suites of rich Arras hangings, and eight suites of coarser Arras, all 'ret verey good.' These gifts would have been included among the tapestries named in the Scottish inventories mentioned below.

In October 1546, a merchant from Antwerp or Lille, Eustace de Coqueil, wrote to Mary of Guise offering her histories and other tapestries, but it seems unlikely that any were bought during this brief period of peace in the war of the Rough Wooing. Another member of this family, Ogier de Coqueil, set up as a merchant in Edinburgh and sold silverware. On 20 February 1557, Mary of Guise granted Eustace de Coqueil, his wife Barbara Bullestraitt and several other members of the family trading rights in Scotland.

=== Tobias and the Angel and the Tint Barne ===
The Tint Barne, the History of the Lost Child, might appear to be the same subject as the History of Tobias. However the five-piece Tobias was listed in 1539 and also in 1542, along with the seven-piece Tint Barne. The subject of the tinte barne was probably the Prodigal Son, a subject listed many times in the inventory of Henry VIII, and Cardinal Wolsey had seven pieces.

=== Chamber of the Antique history ===
These were delivered by a William Schaw in 1539, costing 2466 écu au soleil (crowns of the sun) . It was a group of five (or six) sets of seven pieces, and included seven Sundry pieces histories of Chambers in fine stuff listed in 1539. Additions for this Chamber of Antique History were bought by a servant of John Moffet, conservator of Flanders in April 1541. The word 'chamber' referred to the suite of tapestry rather than any actual room in the palaces. Subjects supplied by William Schaw listed in 1539 include; seven pieces of Poesy; seven pieces of Jason and Golden Fleece; and seven pieces of Venus, Pallas, Hercules, Mars, Bacchus, and Gaia (Mother of the Earth), with the Biblical History of Solomon. Only six pieces of the Jason were listed in 1542. Four pieces of the Solomon were listed in September 1561, and noted circa 1568 to be at Stirling. The others are not heard of again. The Little Solomon was also noted in September 1561, another set, or perhaps three of the seven scenes pieces bought by William Schaw.

The seven-piece History of Perseus was presumably of this group, though not linked in the inventories of 1539 and 1540 to William Schaw's purchase. James IV had bought one piece of a History of Hercules, and nine were listed in 1542. This was a suite separate to the Hercules in the ancient god series of the Chambers.

Similarly, a three-piece History of Romulus was listed in 1542. The Old History of Troy of eight or nine pieces listed in 1539 and 1542 was perhaps a Stewart inheritance, old and already described as worn out, so distinguished from the Aeneas. The family of Mary of Guise's first husband, Louis II d'Orléans, Duc de Longueville, had Troy tapestries at their Château de Châteaudun as early as 1468.

The thirteen pieces of the History of Aeneas were carried from Edinburgh Castle to St. Andrews in May 1539, and are listed in the inventory of 1539. Eight pieces described as the Sailing of Aeneas are listed in November 1561 at Holyroodhouse, with a note, presumably of c.1568, locating them at Stirling Castle. In 1578 there were eight Sailing pieces and four others at Edinburgh Castle. The extra tapestry may have been a piece from the Old History of Troy, or possibly the Sailing of Aeneas set, first listed in November 1561, was newly brought from France by Queen Mary and not part of James's Aeneas. Alexander Seton had some of the Aeneas and Troy at Dunfermline among his 10 old pieces in 1616. An area of the garden of Holyroodhouse was called the Sege of Troy, and there may have been a connection, perhaps only that the tapestries were aired there.

=== The Meleager ===
A separate subject from the Jason, listed in 1539 as the History of Maliasor, this six-piece tapestry of Meleager was at Fotheringhay Castle in 1587 as Mary's own possession. At Fotheringhay, Mary, Queen of Scots, also had the six pieces of the History of Count Foix and the Battle of Ravenna, from the Scottish collection, but as this set was only previously listed in November 1561 it might not have belonged to her parents. An eighteenth-century engraving of Gaston de Foix was said to derive from a similar tapestry. Amias Paulet, her gaoler, spent £113-10s in English money on lining, packing, and hanging eight pieces of her tapestry during her move from Chartley to Fotheringhay Castle. Mary wished the Meleager and Ravenna to be sold after her death, with cloths-of-estate, to fund the return journeys of her physician and Mr Melville. Like the Meleager, the biblical Roboam which appears in most inventories also dates from 1539. Henry VIII had a six-piece suite and a nine-piece suite of the History of Muliager, the latter suitable for a low gallery.

=== Triumph and Assault of a Town ===
This may have been a copy of the famous tapestry commissioned by François Ier from designs by Giulio Romano, the Gestes of Scipion, the story of Scipio Africanus, which includes the scene Siege of Carthagena. However, like the Battle of Ravenna, the five pieces are first listed in November 1561 and so this too might not have belonged to James and Mary of Guise, unless they were among the unspecified tapestries bought by William Schaw in 1539. However, there are other tapestries with the subject Siege of a Town in late medieval style which answer the description. Another possibility is that these were scenes of the Siege of Troy, a subject found in Henry VIII's collection. Possibly, this tapestry was in mind when Mary of Guise, according to John Knox, remarked that the aftermath of the failed assault on Leith of 7 May 1560 was the fairest tapestry she had ever seen.

=== Unicorns, apes, beasts and others ===
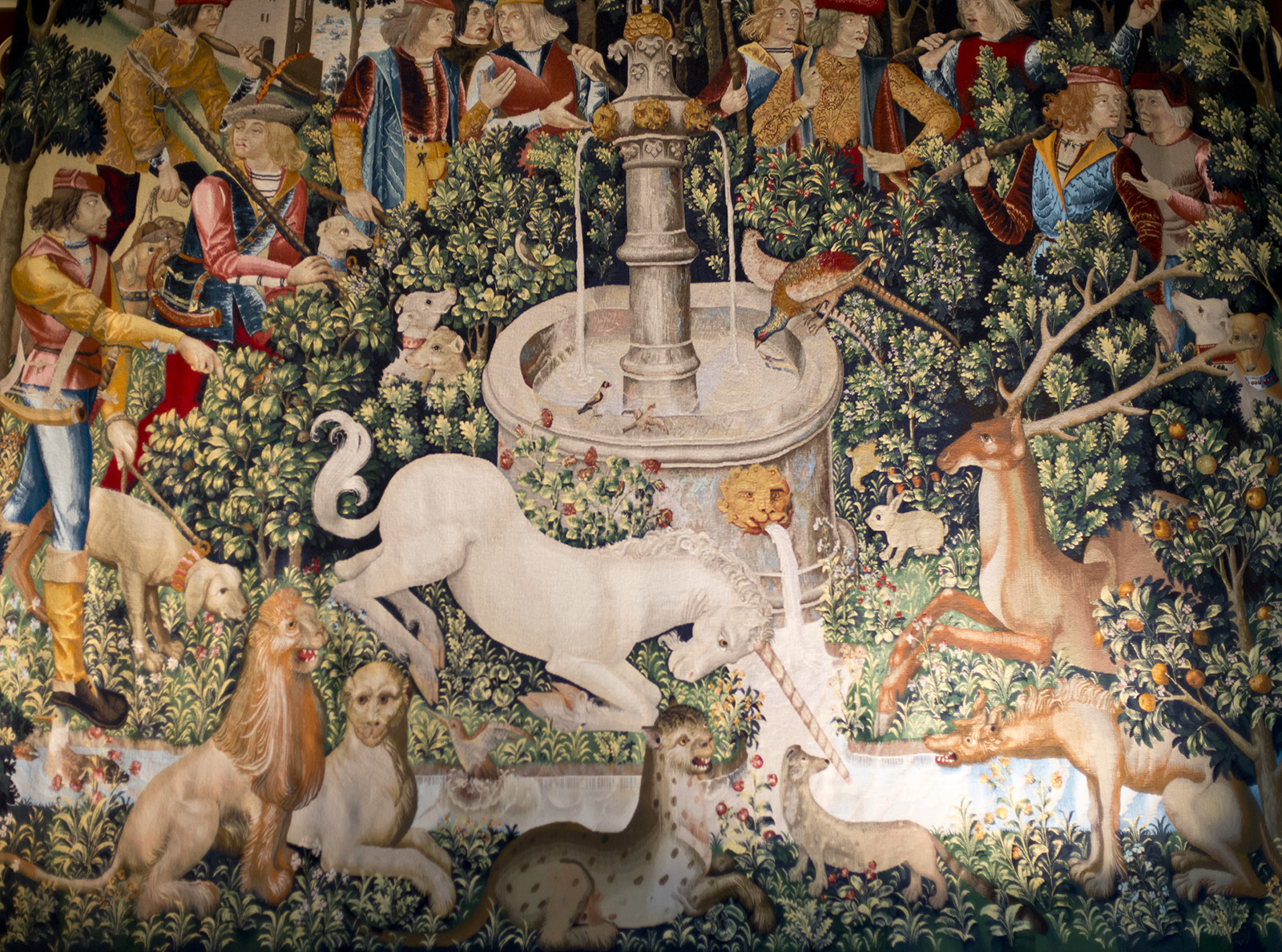
Recreation of the Unicorn Tapestries for Stirling Castle

James V's other named tapestries included the six Great and eight Little Unicorn pieces. The Great Unicorn set has been identified as another version of the famous tapestries, The Hunt of the Unicorn, now in The Cloisters of the Metropolitan Museum of Art in New York. Faithful copies using the original technique are being made for display in the Palace of Stirling Castle. These unicorn tapestries had belonged to his father, James IV, but the subject was still popular in 1540, when Pierre de Clanquemeulle, companion tapestry maker, was hired by Léon Brocart, master weaver in Paris, to complete two pieces of La Chasse à la licorne.

Seven pieces of the History of the Apis and uther Bestis were recorded in 1539. Six pieces of the History of Apes were recorded in 1561. In January 1563 three pieces of this tapestry with monkeys, the tapisserie des singes, were given by Mary Queen of Scots to Pierre Marnard the court "fruictier", a kitchen officer who took part in masques.

Listed in the September 1561 inventory, ten pieces of History of Hunting and Hawking may have been a separate item originally belonging to James V, and perhaps distinct from the six-piece set of the Hunting of the Sanglier (Wild Boar), and seven-piece Coningars (the Rabbit Hunt), listed in later inventories. One scene from this Rabbit Hunt, otherwise called the L’histoire des Chasseurs de Cogny in an inventory written in French, was said to have been lost at Linlithgow during the 1566 baptism of James VI at Stirling. However this loss had already been recorded in 1565, as having occurred at Linlithgow during the keepership of James Sandilands, perhaps the one later said to have been cut by "Andro Cockburn fule." The other six pieces were destroyed at the Kirk o'Field explosion. Another tapestry of the "Rabbit Hunt" had been made into bed curtains. The Burrell Collection in Glasgow has an example of a tapestry of this subject, dated from c. 1475.

James IV bought one scene of Marcus Coriolanus, which may be the Mathiolus tapestry mentioned in later inventories, and a Solomon, which may be Judgement of Solomon noted in September 1561, of worsett with gold. Alternatively, Susan Groag Bell wonders if this Mathiolus was the first scene of the City of Ladies suite bought in 1538, featuring the name of the author Matheolus as a protagonist illustrating the works of Christine de Pisan.

The subject of the History of the Shepherds of seven pieces and the History of Calveris and Moris of four pieces noted in 1561 may be obscure. The eight-piece Triumph of Verity also noted in November 1561 may have come to Scotland with Mary in 1561, unless perhaps this was yet another name for the City of Dames.

== The tapestry men ==
Margaret Tudor's English yeoman of the wardrobe was Harry Roper, who made her bed sheets and window curtains, washed clothes, mended her tapestries and scarlet hangings and perfumed them with violet powder. Hooks for hanging tapestry cost two shillings for a hundred, larger hooks called "crochattis" were five shillings the hundred.

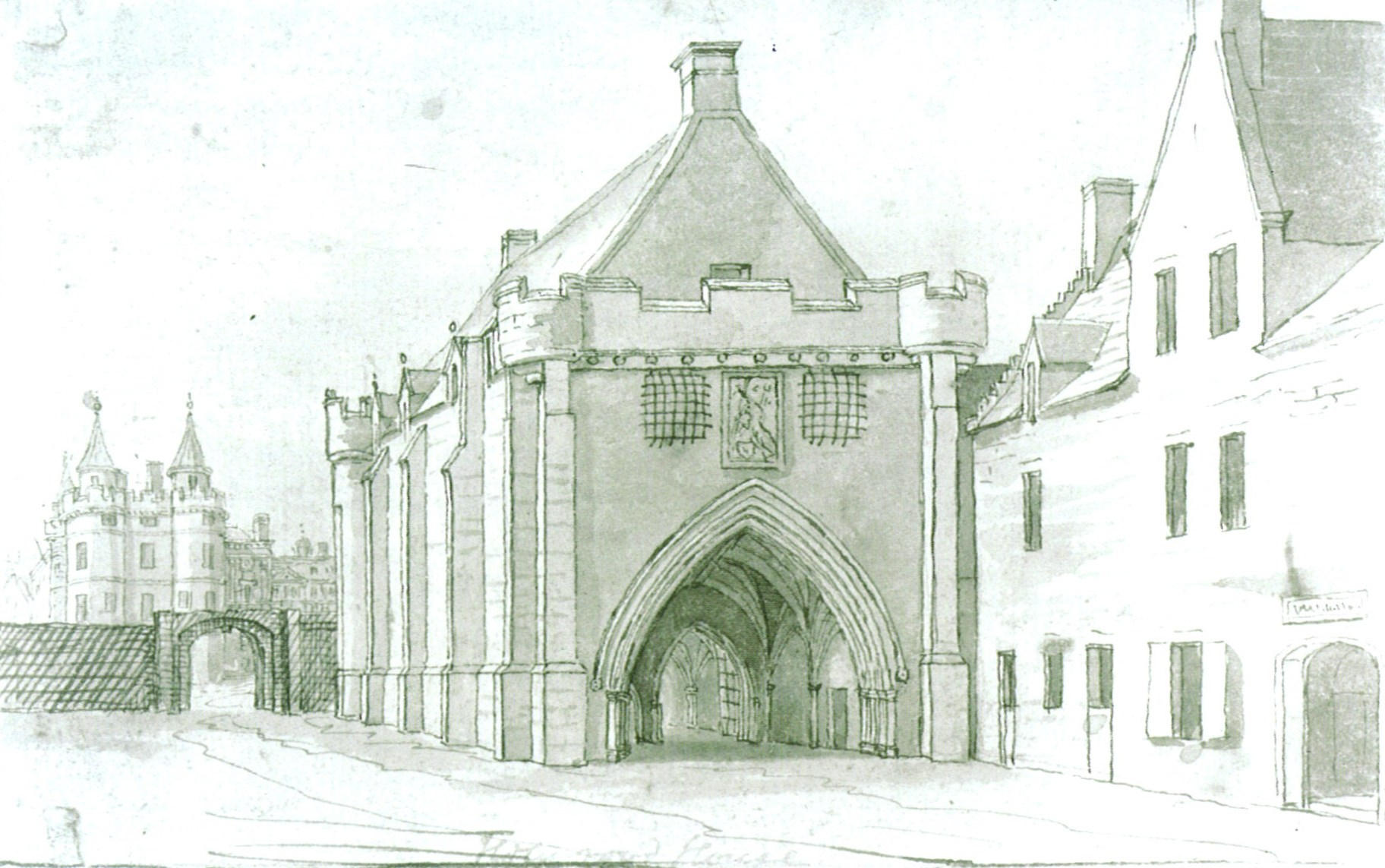
The gatehouse at Holyrood Palace was converted into tapestry workshop in 1537

James IV built a gatehouse at Holyrood Palace on the street now called Abbey Strand. He installed a glazier, Thomas Peebles, who made windows for the royal palaces, in the rooms above the passageway or pend. In 1537 James V moved the glazier's workshop, and the gatehouse was refurbished for mending tapestry.

A French tapestry worker, Guillaume or William Eidbe, moved to Scotland with his wife and children in 1537. He had been in Paris with James V in 1536. In 1538, Eidbe or Edbe looked after a French nurse and her family, and a midwife, who came to Scotland with Mary of Guise.

When James V moved around Scotland the tapissiers or 'tapestry men' packed up the tapestries and set them up at his destination, and carried out running repairs. George Steill bound up twelve scenes of the History of Aeneas with cords and carried them from Edinburgh to St Andrews in May 1539 for the marriage of Joanna Gresmore to Robert Beaton of Creich. The "tapesar" came with the wardrobe servant Malcolm Gourlay to furnish tents for James V and Mary of Guise in Glenartney and Glen Finglas for the hunts in September 1539.

Eight pieces of tapestry were specially repaired for the coronation of Mary of Guise in January 1540, and others were often relined with new canvas. Jacques Habet, William Edbe, and George Steill lined the rough or newly plastered walls of the castle at Crawfordjohn to save wear on tapestries in July 1541. Apart from this work, the men also made up and embroidered state beds with luxury imported silks and taffetas with hanks of gold thread, finished with passementerie and ostrich feather trimmings. Guillaume, hired in France in 1538, Habet, and the embroiderer Robinet, were doubtless Frenchmen, but William Edbe was Scottish. Habet may have been the "Jacques Hebert" later hired by the Parisian master weaver Girard Laurens in 1564.

There was extra work when the tapestry was taken out of the castles and used on other occasions. In May 1544, when an English army burnt Edinburgh, the tapestries were carried up the Royal Mile from Holyroodhouse to the Castle for safety and watched by Regent Arran's wardrobe servant Malcolm Gourlay. Regent Arran borrowed the royal tapestry for his daughter Barbara Hamilton's wedding to Lord Gordon in February 1549, and after it had been cleaned by six apprentices it was brought out for the visit of Mary of Guise's brother, the Marquis de Maine.

The best tapestry was brought out to decorate the hall and Chapel of Holyroodhouse for the ceremonies and masques in February 1566 when Nicolas d'Angennes, seigneur of Rambouillet, brought the Order of Saint Michael for Henry Stuart, Lord Darnley. After the battle of Carberry Hill, when Mary, Queen of Scots was imprisoned in Lochleven Castle, the tapestry in Holyrood Palace was taken down and stored in Edinburgh Castle in October 1567. Tapestry remained in place to decorate the rooms at Stirling Castle, where James VI was brought up. In April 1569, tapestry was hung in Glasgow for the French ambassador. When English soldiers came to Scotland in 1570, William Maitland of Lethington ordered Servais de Condé to transport the tapestry and furnishings of Holyroodhouse to Edinburgh Castle.

In August 1571, William Murray brought tapestry from Stirling Castle to decorate Stirling Tolbooth for the Parliament. In April 1572, the Deanery at Restalrig was hung with tapestry for the English ambassadors Thomas Randolph and William Drury, and in September 1572, William Murray, the varlet of James VI's bedchamber hung the tolbooth of Stirling with tapestry.

=== William Beaton ===
William Beaton or Betoun was an embroiderer and "tapester". He also repaired the royal tapestries and wall hangings. In October 1580, he was paid for work hanging tapestry during James's progress and visit to Holyrood Palace. He supplied 800 hooks called "cleiks" and cords to pack up the tapestries. In 1594, Beaton made a new cloth of gold to spread as a "tapis" on the chapel floor at the baptism of Prince Henry, and cushions for the seats of guests.

=== George Strathauchin ===
On 7 October 1584, the Master of Gray was made Keeper of the Wardrobe, including the tapestry, with all officers of the household commanded to reverence, acknowledge and obey him. George Strathauchin (d. 1604), an embroiderer, was James's "tapiser" with annual salary of £40 and lodgings. In October 1589 Strathauchin packed up tapestries in chests to ship to Norway and Denmark with James VI when he went to meet his bride Anne of Denmark, and travelled with the king to furnish the royal lodgings. Strathauchin and the master of work William Schaw decorated St Giles Kirk with tapestry for the coronation of Anne of Denmark. He mended wall hangings and tapestries for the 1594 baptism. In September 1598 he was paid for transporting Anne of Denmark's beds and tapestry to Falkland Palace and hanging her bedchamber.

In 1624, John Auchmoutie of Scoughall was Master of the King's Wardrobe in Scotland. He petitioned the king for better pay for the four tapestry keepers and workers in Scotland, and the replacement of the deceased Nicolas Elmar with Martin Leache.

== Sources ==
- Accounts of the Lord High Treasurer of Scotland, vol. 7, Edinburgh (1907), records of Scottish royal purchases
- Accounts of the Lord High Treasurer of Scotland, vol. 8, Edinburgh (1908)
- Leland, John, De Rebus Britannicis Collectanea, .., ed., Hearne, Thomas, vol. 4, (1770), pp. 280–300
- Harrison, John G., Wardrobe Inventories of James V: British Library MS Royal 18 C (Historic Scotland: Edinburgh, 2008)
- Thomas, Andrea, Princelie Majestie, the court of James V of Scotland (John Donald, 2005) ISBN 0-85976-611-X
- Thomson, Thomas, Collection (1815). A Collection of Royal Inventories., (Edinburgh, 1815)
- Robertson Joseph, Robertson, Joseph (1863). Inventaires de la Royne d'Ecosse., (Bannatyne Club: Edinburgh, 1863)
