= Thomas (Robert) Cochrane =

Thomas Cochrane
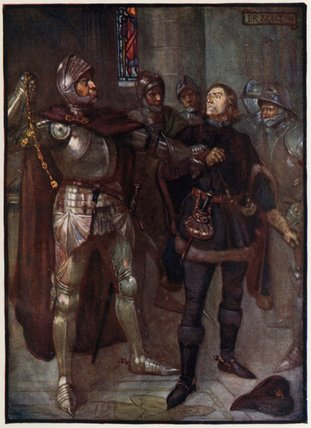
- A 1906 illustration depicting Robert Cochrane (right) being arrested by the Earl of Angus in 1482
- Born: Scotland
- Died: 1482; Scotland
- Cause of death: Execution
- Other name: Robert Cochrane
- Known for: Supposed royal servant and familiar of James III of Scotland

Thomas Cochrane (said to have been executed and forfeited 1482), also referred to as "Robert Cochrane" in sixteenth-century chronicle accounts, was a royal servant and alleged "familiar" or favourite of King James III of Scotland. Chronicle accounts allege that his influence over the king incurred the wrath of the old aristocracy, culminating in a coup at Lauder in which James III was arrested and Cochrane was executed.

There exists uncertainty about even the most basic facts of Cochrane's life. Even his correct first name has been disputed, which is given as both Thomas and Robert by different 16th century chroniclers. Contemporary sources however only mention a Thomas Cochrane as an officer of the king in the late 1470s and early 1480s. Despite his limited presence in the contemporary record, Cochrane's career as a royal favourite and man who encouraged the king's interest in unmanly pursuits not deemed appropriate for a monarch has dominated accounts of James III's reign until the present day.

== Life and legend ==
Sixteenth-century accounts such as those provided by Robert Lindsay of Pitscottie, John Lesley and George Buchanan portray James III as a weak king and a dilettante who surrounded himself with a group of talented but low-born "familiars" or favourites. Cochrane was the most important of these favourites. He was alleged by Pitscottie to have been first a stone-mason who became involved in the king's building projects. The later writer William Drummond of Hawthornden in his History of the 5 Jameses increased the status of Cochrane to that of an architect. Legend made him the designer of the Great Hall at Stirling Castle (built in the subsequent reign), and a hall at Falkland.

The chronicles relate that he advised the king to debase the coinage in order to raise cash. He was opposed by the king's younger brothers, Alexander Stewart, 3rd Duke of Albany and John Stewart, Earl of Mar. The Earl of Mar was arrested and imprisoned, and died soon after. Albany escaped and gathered support in England. Although the king was alleged in chronicle accounts to have given Cochrane the title of Earl of Mar after his brother's death, no contemporary record of such a grant survives. Yet we do know that a Thomas Cochrane was an usher of the king's chamber door and one Thomas Cochrane was made constable of Kildrummy Castle, in the earldom of Mar around March 1482.

== Arrest and death ==
The chronicles relate that Cochrane's downfall came during an invasion by an English army led by the king's younger brother, Alexander, 3rd duke of Albany, and Richard, duke of Gloucester, the future King Richard III of England. Albany had promised to give up part of Scotland to England in exchange for being placed on the throne under the Treaty of Fotheringhay. A cabal of aristocrats sympathetic to Albany's objectives, including Archibald Douglas, 5th Earl of Angus, took the opportunity afforded by a gathering of the Scottish host at Lauder Bridge intended to launch a counterattack to the English invasion to arrest James III and execute Cochrane and other alleged favourites.

The chronicle written 100 years later by Pitscottie supplies and probably invents material. Cochrane, said to be dressed in lavish costume, knocked on the door of the church where the courtiers of the old aristocracy were assembled, saying, "It is I the Earle of Mar". They tore his gold tipped hunting horn and chain of office from him, and hanged him from the bridge with his accomplices, including the tailor James Hommyll.

Angus was much later reported to have been given the nickname "Bell the Cat" by David Hume of Godscroft, reflecting an account of him stepping forward to put the execution of the James III's favourites into effect.

== Doubts about the story ==
Many aspects of the chronicle accounts can be questioned in comparison with surviving contemporary records. Some historians have been more sympathetic to James III, seeing him as a cultured man among the Scottish nobility at that time, and defended his kingship against later criticisms. Norman Macdougall published a biography of James III in which he argues that, far from being a weak king, he fully exercised regal power. Macdougall dismissed the story of his court being dominated by "favourites of low birth" as the invention of chroniclers writing in the next century. Macdougall found two records of a Thomas Cochrane; one reference suggests that Cochrane was an usher of the king's chamber door, and the other that a Thomas Cochrane had forfeited the lands of Cousland near Dalkeith. Cochrane of Cousland, Macdougall concludes, may have been the usher and met his end at Lauder Bridge. Macdougall also follows the development of the story in later writers and points particularly to William Drummond of Hawthornden's History of the 5 Jameses for setting the final elaboration of the story. Macdougall argues that Hawthornden increased the status of Cochrane to that of an architect in order to rescue the king's reputation.
