= Leonardo Frescobaldi =

Italian merchant based in England

Leonardo Frescobaldi (1485–1529) was an Italian merchant based in England at the court of Henry VIII.

== Career ==
He was a son of Jerome Frescobaldi (died 1517), a merchant of Florentine origin based in Antwerp and Bruges, and Dianora Gualterotti. The Frescobaldi family had a wide mercantile interest. Jerome (Girolamo) Frescobaldi supplied luxury goods to the court of James IV of Scotland, and some textiles for the coronation of Henry VII of England in 1485.

His brother Francesco Frescobaldi is said to have offered hospitality and employment to Thomas Cromwell in Florence around the year 1504, according to Matteo Bandello.

Leonardo and his brother Filippo Frescobaldi based themselves at the English court from 1511, where there were several other Italian merchants in residence. Leonardo obtained a licence to export 100 sacks of wool from Southampton without paying custom duty. Filippo Frescobaldi supplied cloth of gold to line a pair of wide russet sleeves and crimson sarsenet for a traverse (a cloth partition or canopy) and curtains supplied to Mary Tudor, Princess of Castile in July 1511. Antonio Cavilari or Cavallari of Lucca also supplied fabric for her costume. The chronicle writer Edward Hall noted that Leonardo Frescobaldi and Antonio Cavilari supplied cloth of gold and silks to the court. Frescobaldi and Cavalari imported Turkish alum.

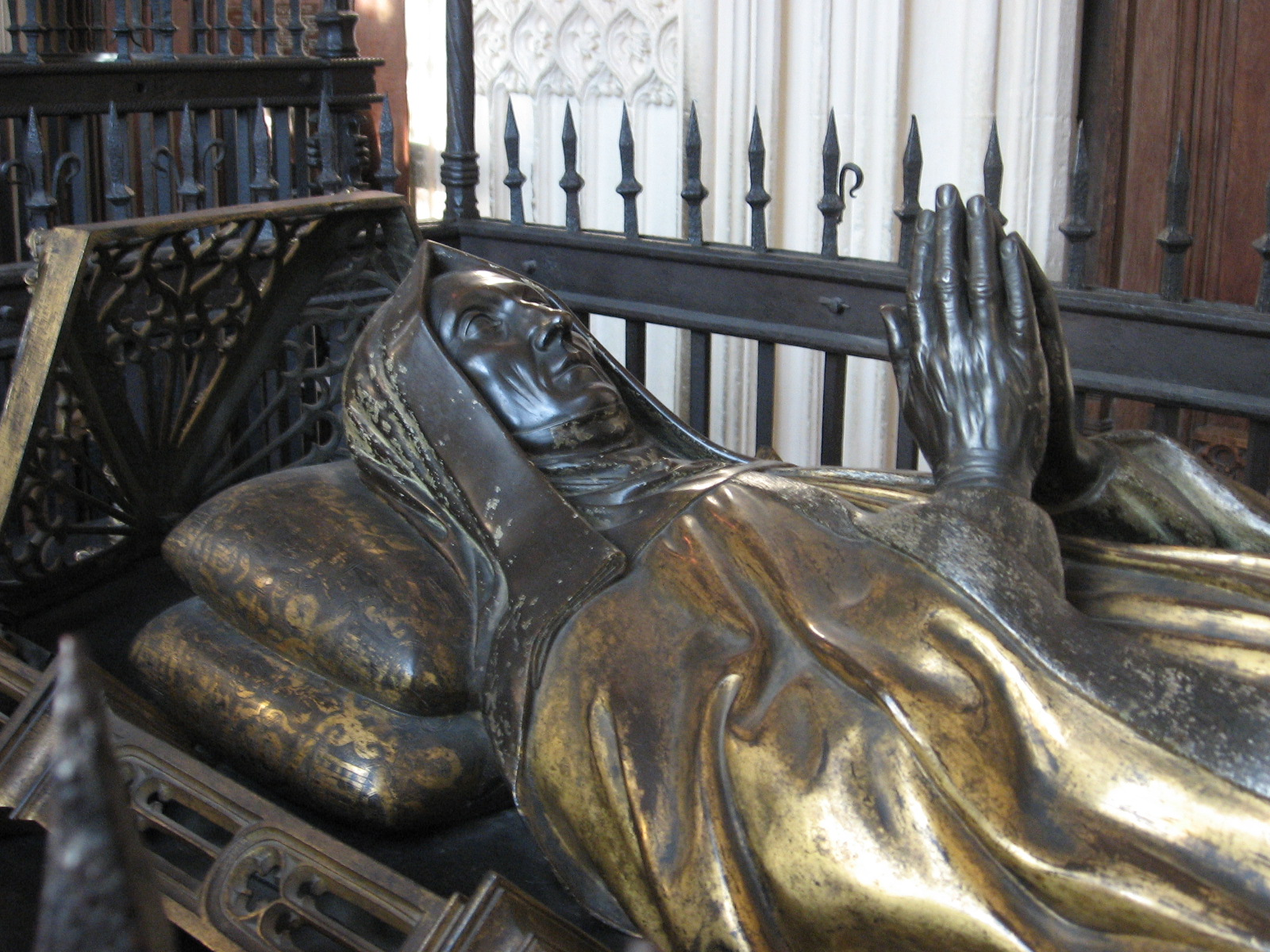
Leonardo Frescobaldi was involved in the contract for the tomb of Lady Margaret Beaufort, Westminster Abbey

Leonardo Frescobaldi stood as a guarantor with John (Giovanni) Cavalcanti for the Florentine artist Pietro Torrigiano when he was contracted to make the tomb of Margaret Beaufort in 1511. He was a party to Torrigiano's indenture of 23 November 1511. Cavalcanti and other Florentine merchants were guarantors to Torrigiano's indenture for a tomb for Henry VIII and Catherine of Aragon, and two merchants from Lucca underwrote another agreement for Henry VII's tomb in March 1517.

A Netherlandish artist involved in the project for Lady Margaret Beaufort's tomb, Meynnart Wewyck had been in Scotland in 1502 and 1503 painting portraits. Later, in 1529, Giovanni and Antonio Cavallari of Lucca were involved in expenses for Cardinal Wolsey's tomb, advancing money for gilding.

Leonardo Frescobaldi and John Cavalcanti were partners in supplying harness (armour), saltpetre of good quality "after the finest making in Naples", guns, and cable to Henry VIII for the Tower of London armoury and John Heron. Cavalcanti supplied cloth of gold, velvet, and other fabrics used at the Field of the Cloth of Gold in 1520.

In 1513, Leonardo Frescobaldi was given an annuity or pension by Henry VIII as a vendor of cloth of gold and silver, and he was made an usher of the king's chamber, with an income of 50 marks.

Leonardo Frescobaldi supplied damask gold thread to the king's embroiderer John Milner. He also supplied guns and military equipment to Henry VIII, including halberds, axes and handguns, 4,500 suits of armour, cables for the king's ships, and a suite of twelve cannons called the "Twelve Apostles". Some of this weaponry may have been used in France and against Scotland at the battle of Flodden. Cardinal Wolsey raised loans to pay for the armour and artillery purchases of Henry VIII from the Frescobaldi and Cavalcanti banks.

The Frescobaldi company undertook to convey money from Henry VIII to Maximilian I, Holy Roman Emperor in 1516, according to Edward Hall, in partnership with "Anthony Caveler of Genoa". However, they failed to make the transfer in due time, compromising the Emperor's military operations in Italy. Under pressure, and despite the advocacy of Cardinal Campeggio in England, the Frescobaldi firm was bankrupted in May and June 1518.

Leonardo Frescobaldi was advised of plans for the meeting of Henry VIII and Francis I of France at the Field of the Cloth of Gold in 1520, and notified Italian merchants that Henry VIII would order a large quantity of silks and cloth of gold. Some of the textiles used were supplied by the Bardi and Cavalcanti families.
