= Pietro Torrigiano =

Italian sculptor

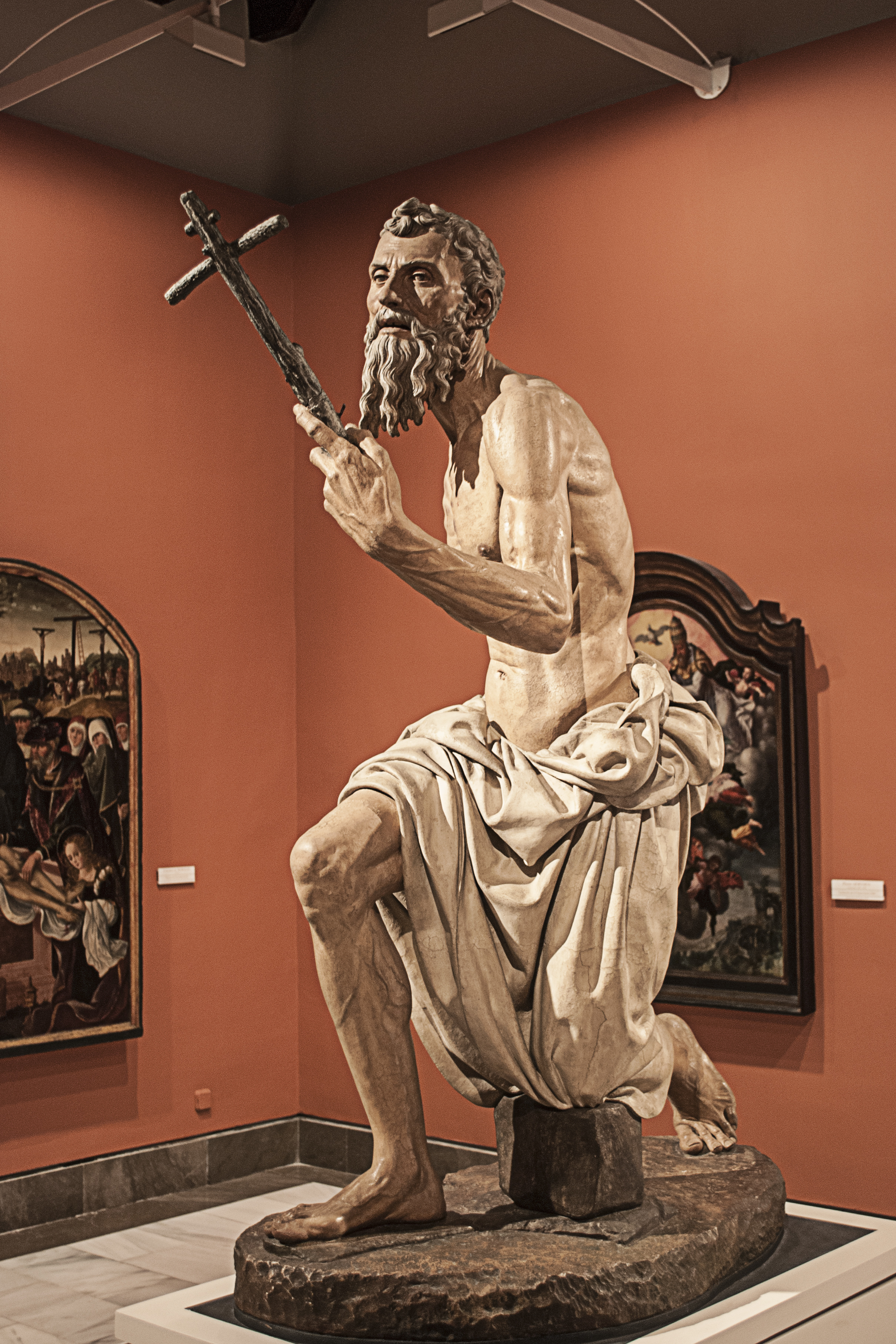
- Sculpture of Saint Jerome in Museum of Fine Arts of Seville
- Born: 24 November 1472; Florence
- Died: August 1528 (aged 55); Seville
- Movement: Florentine school

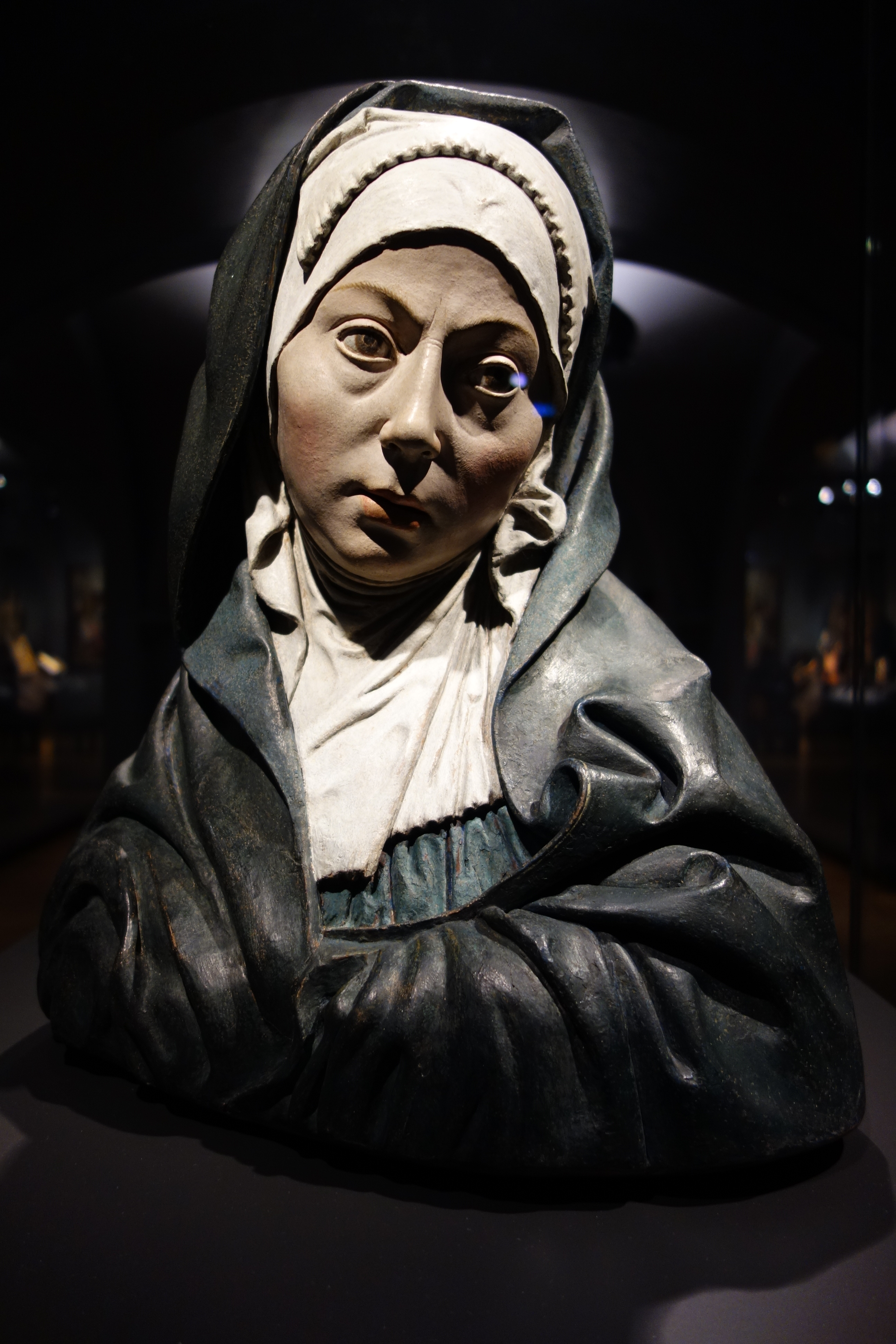
Mater Dolorosa, Rijksmuseum

Pietro Torrigiano (24 November 1472 – July/August 1528) was an Italian Renaissance sculptor from Florence, who had to flee the city after breaking Michelangelo's nose. He then worked abroad, and died in prison in Spain. He was important in introducing Renaissance art to England, but his career was adversely affected by his violent temperament.

== Assault on Michelangelo ==
Torrigiano was born in Florence. According to Giorgio Vasari, he was one of the group of talented youths who studied art under the patronage of Lorenzo de' Medici in Florence.

Benvenuto Cellini, reporting a conversation with Torrigiano, relates that he and Michelangelo, while both young, were copying Masaccio's frescoes in the Carmine chapel, when some slighting remark made by Michelangelo so enraged Torrigiano that he struck him on the nose, breaking it. The disfigurement is conspicuous in all the portraits of Michelangelo. According to Cellini, Torrigiano said,

“This [Michelangelo] Buonarroti and I used, when we were boys, to go into the Church of the Carmine, to learn drawing from the chapel of Masaccio. It was Buonarroti’s habit to banter all who were drawing there; and one day, among others, when he was annoying me, I got more angry than usual, and clenching my fist, gave him such a blow on the nose, that I felt bone and cartilage go down like biscuit beneath my knuckles; and this mark of mine he will carry with him to the grave.”

Michelangelo's friend Vasari says that Torrigiano instigated the fight because he was motivated by jealousy, and that he was forced to flee from Florence as a result of his act.

Torrigiano, having formed an intimacy with Michelangelo, and becoming envious of his distinction in art, one day, when jeering our artist, struck him so violent a blow in the face that his nose was broken and crushed in a manner from which it could never be recovered, so that he was marked for life; whereupon Torrigiano was banished from Florence.

He goes on to say that the assault was reported to Lorenzo de' Medici who was "so greatly incensed against the offender, that if Torrigiano had not fled from Florence he would without doubt have inflicted some very heavy punishment on him."

Whether or not he was "banished", soon after this Torrigiano visited Rome, and helped Pinturicchio in modelling the elaborate stucco decorations in the Apartamenti Borgia for Pope Alexander VI.

== In England ==
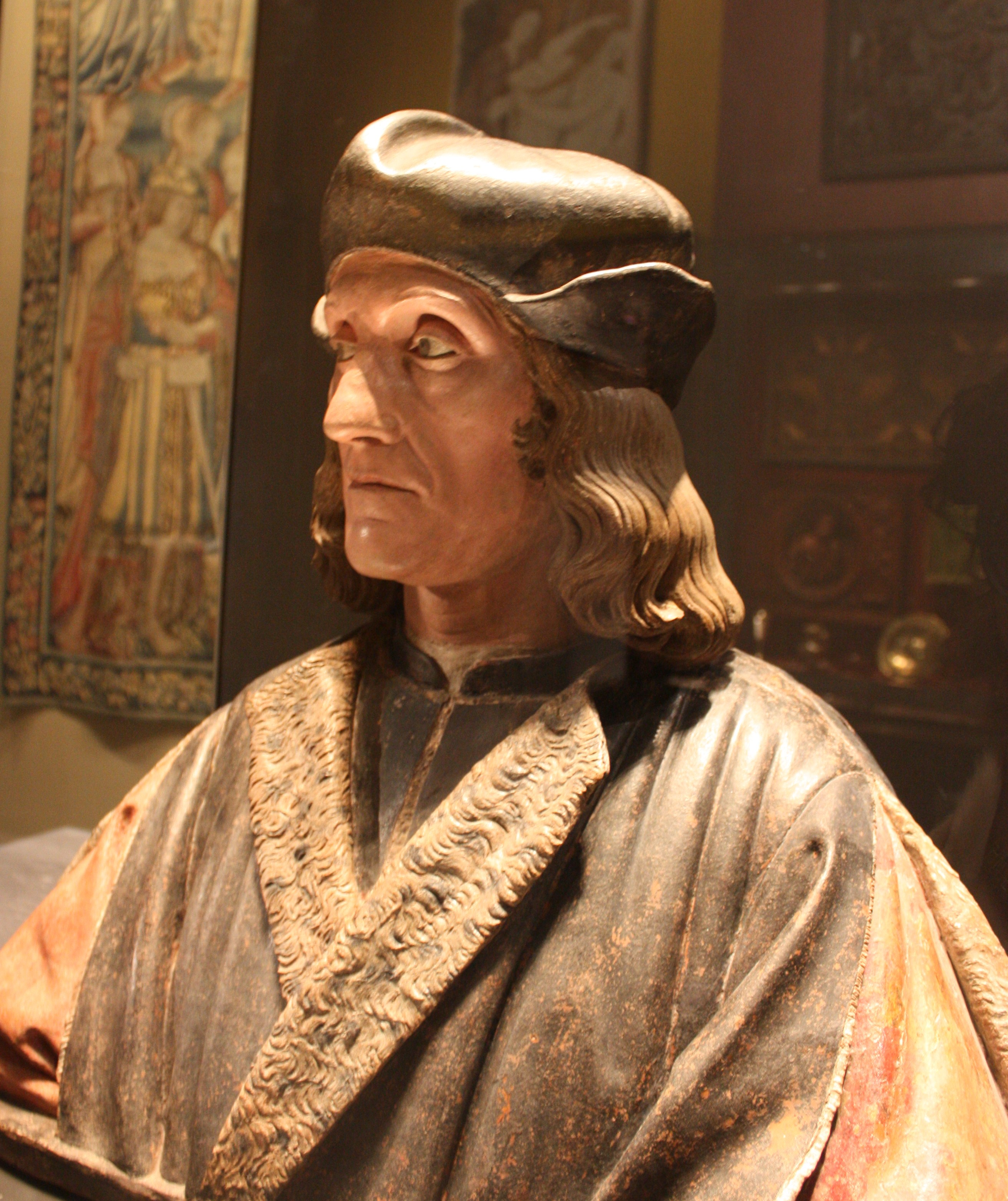
Terracotta bust of Henry VII made by Torrigiano

After some time spent as a hired soldier in the service of different states, Torrigiano was invited to England, possibly by the young Henry VIII immediately after the death of his father, Henry VII. He produced terracotta sculptures depicting Henry VII, Henry VIII and the ecclesiastic John Fisher. He also probably made the intensely realistic funeral effigy of Henry VII. He was commissioned to create the tomb monument of Lady Margaret Beaufort, mother of Henry VII, in 1510, working to "patrones" or pattern drawings by Meynnart Wewyck. His work was underwritten by two Florentine merchants in London, Giovanni Cavalcanti and Leonardo Frescobaldi, who acted as guarantors.

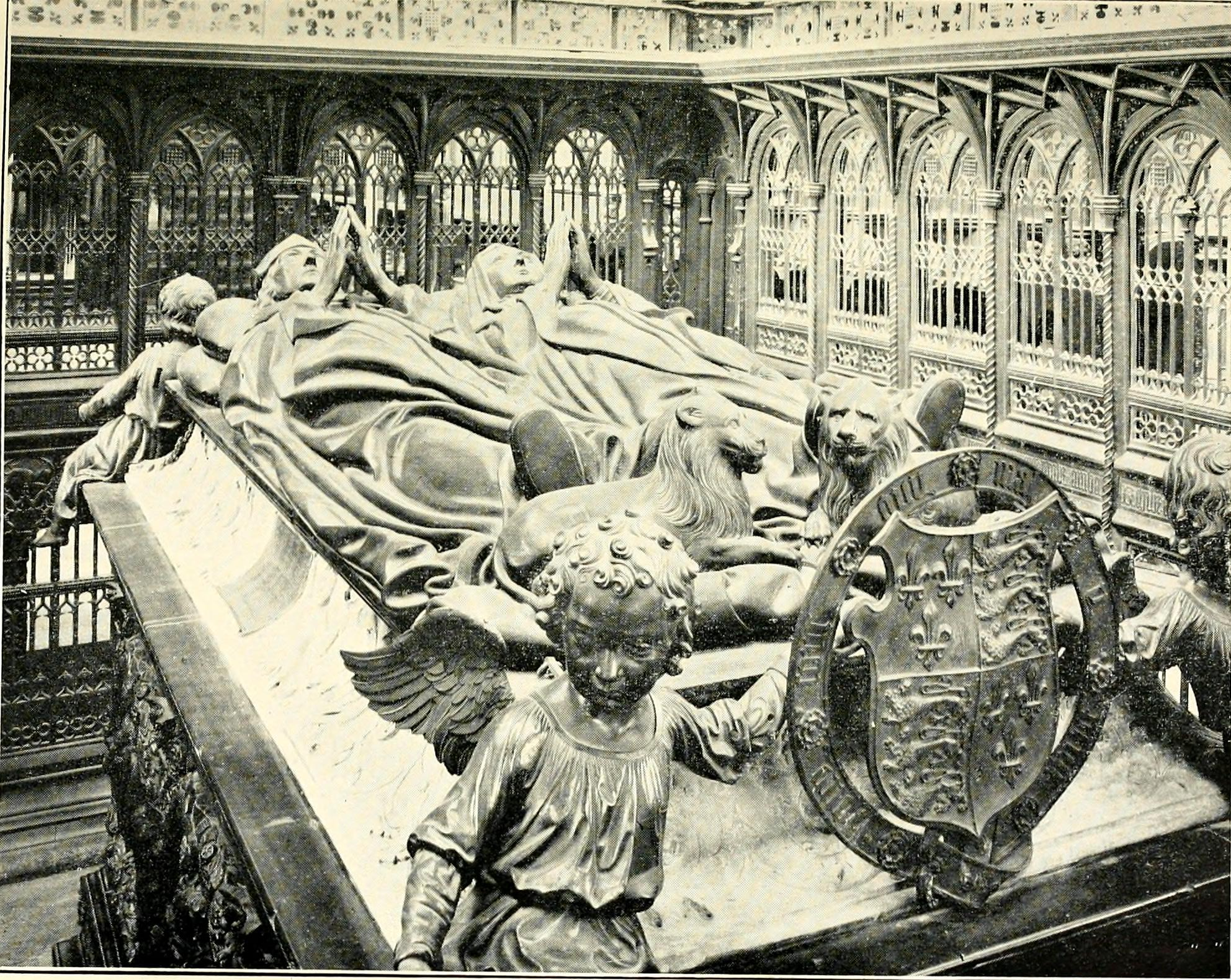
Henry VII's Tomb, Westminster Abbey

After the success of this work, he was given the commission for the magnificent effigial monument for Henry VII and his queen, which still exists in the Henry VII Lady Chapel of Westminster Abbey. This appears to have been begun in 1512, but was not finished till 1517. The two effigies are well modelled, and there can be no doubt the head of the king is a fine posthumous portrait. John Pope-Hennessy called it "the finest Renaissance tomb north of the Alps".

After this Torrigiano received the commission for the altar, retable and baldacchino which stood at the west, outside the screen of Henry VII's monument. The altar had marble pilasters at the angles, two of which still exist, and below the mensa was a life-sized figure of the dead Christ in painted terra cotta. The retable consisted of a large relief of the Resurrection. The baldacchino was of marble, with enrichments of gilt bronze; part of its frieze still exists, as do also a large number of fragments of the terra-cotta angels which surmounted the baldacchino and parts of the large figure of Christ. The whole of this work was destroyed by the Puritans in the 17th century.

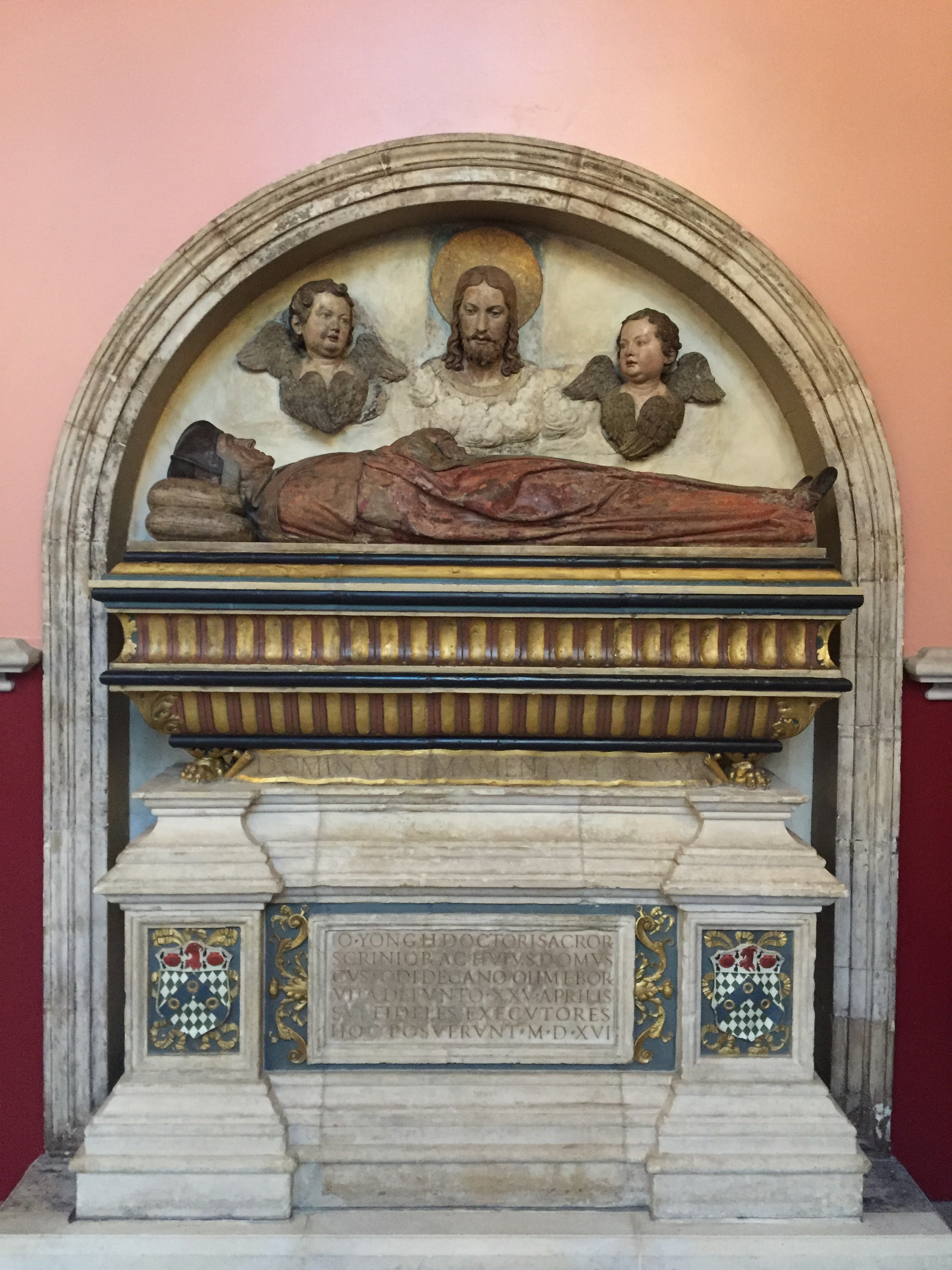
A monument of Dr John Yonge, Master of the Rolls, displayed at the King's College London's Maughan Library

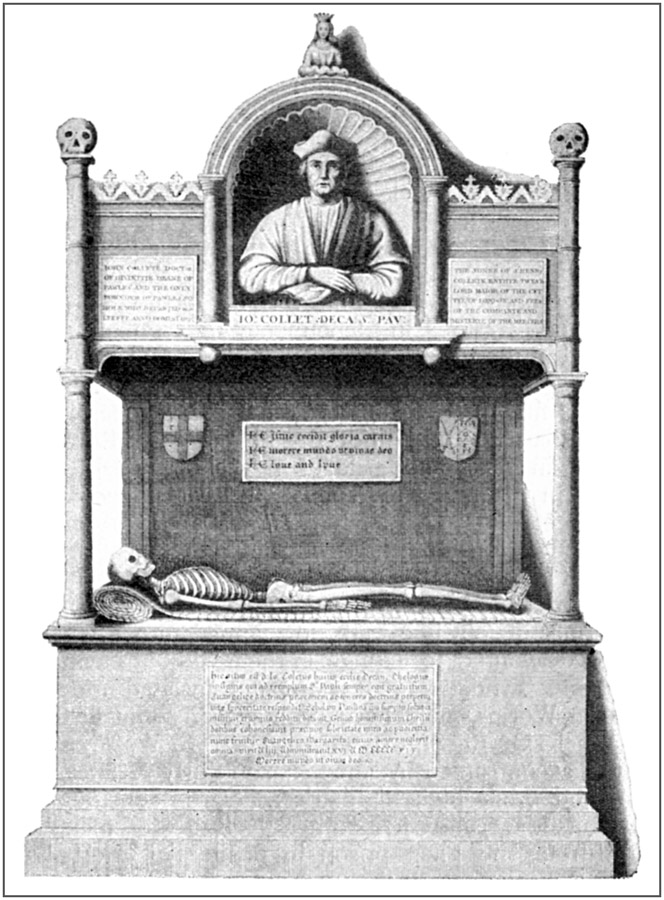
Tomb of John Colet, D.D., Dean of St. Paul's. After Hollar.

Henry VIII also commissioned Torrigiano to make him a magnificent funerary monument, somewhat similar to that of Henry VII, but one-fourth larger, to be placed in a chapel at Windsor; it was, however, never completed, and its rich bronze was melted by the Commonwealth, together with that of Wolsey's tomb. The indentures for these various works still exist, and are printed by Neale, Westminster Abbey, (London, 1818). These interesting documents are written in English, and in them the Florentine is called "Peter Torrysany". For Henry VII's monument he contracted to receive £1500, for the altar and its fittings £1000, and £2000 for Henry VIII's monument.

Torrigiano was also commissioned to work on the monument of Dr John Yonge (d.1516), Master of the Rolls during the time of Henry VIII, who was entombed in the Rolls Chapel of the now Maughan Library. He may also have been responsible for the tomb of John Colet which was destroyed in the 1666 fire of London, but may have been preserved in a cast of the head.

== Return to Italy and Spain ==
While these royal works were going on, Torrigiano visited Florence in order to get skilled assistants. He tried to induce Benvenuto Cellini to come to England to help him, but Cellini refused partly from his dislike to the brutal and swaggering manners of Torrigiano. Cellini wrote,

This man had a splendid person and a most arrogant spirit, with the air of a great soldier more than a sculptor, especially in regard to his vehement gestures and his resonant voice, together with a habit he had of knitting his brows, enough to frighten any man of courage. He kept talking every day about his gallant feats among those beasts of Englishmen.

When he heard the story of what Torrigiano did to Michelangelo, Cellini says he could no longer "bear the sight of him".

The latter part of Torrigiano's life was spent in Spain, especially at Seville, where, besides the painted figure of St. Hieronymus in the museum, some terracotta sculpture by him still exists. His violent temper got him into difficulties with the Spanish Inquisition, and he died in 1528 in prison.

According to Vasari, Torrigiano was swindled of his payment by the Duke of Arcos for a sculpture of the Virgin and Child. As an act of vengeance for being fooled as such he mutilated the work with his chisel, whereupon the Duke, considering himself affronted, denounced Torrigiano as a heretic. In other stories, he was carving the Virgin and made a mistake, at which point he defaced the statue in his annoyance, and was seen by clerics and charged as a result by the Spanish Inquisition. Vasari misdates his death to 1522.

== See also ==
- Artists of the Tudor court
- Sevillian school of sculpture
