= James Hommyll =

Businesspeople from Edinburgh (1473–1515)

James Hommyll (floruit 1473–1515), was a wealthy merchant in Edinburgh.

The surname may also be spelled as "Hommyl" or "Homyl". James Hommyll was the son of a royal tailor, also called "James Hommyll".

== James Hommyll the elder, and James III ==
His father, also called James Hommyll, was the king's tailor. In August 1573 he made a black velvet doublet with a "side gown" for James III of Scotland from French black woollen cloth supplied by Walter Bertraham. Bertraham had a substantial house on the Royal Mile, used, after his death, as a lodging for the Spanish ambassador Pedro de Ayala in 1496. In 1474 Hommyll lined a blue gown for the king with cloth called "tartare" supplied by Issabell Williamsone. In January 1478 the king gave him an annual pension of £20. He was regarded as a member of the king's household, and given £20 to repair his own house.

It has been suggested that the tailor was one of the favourites of James III who were executed at Lauder Bridge in 1482 during the crisis following the invasion of Scotland by the English, John Lesley wrote that "James Hommyll tailyeour" was a victim, but his pension was paid for a number of years after that date. He was forfeited in 1488 for quitting Scotland after the battle of Sauchieburn, joining an embassy in England from James III against the supporters of his son, but was pardoned by James IV.

== Career ==
James Hommyll was a merchant involved in the Flanders trade. He supplied James IV with crimson satin and other cloth for a doublet on St Mungo's day, 13 January 1496, possibly for the tournament held at the wedding of Perkin Warbeck and Lady Catherine Gordon. Hommyll provided James IV and Margaret Tudor with tapestries for decorating the palaces. These included; a piece with the subject of Hercules, two pieces of Susanna sewn together, a Susanna bed cover, a Solomon, and a Marcus Coriolanus.

James Homyll provided materials bought in Flanders for cords and silk points (fasteners) used costume at the 1503 royal wedding. The king bought a hat of fine scarlet cloth from James Hommyll in December 1503. The king bought clothes for his younger brother William Hommyll, who was a courtier and, like his brother, a merchant trading in Flanders goods. The clothes were made of fabric bought from James Homyll. James IV sent William Hommyl as his messenger to Portugal in December 1503.

In 1503 or 1504 Hommyll hosted some servants of the King of Spain in his house in Edinburgh. On 26 November 1504 four African people who had been at Dunfermline Palace, who were recorded in the royal accounts as "Ethiopians", were lodged in his house, probably including Ellen More and her sister Margaret. Hommyll also hosted a Portuguese man who was escorting the African people, and two horses and other animals belonging to the king. On 11 December an African described as the "More las" was christened. In July 1505 a Leith mariner and timber merchant William Wod received a reward of £12 Scots bringing the African people accompanied by a horse from Portugal, a jennet horse, and a must cat.

In March 1507 the king bought an "image" from Hommyll costing £18 Scots which was perhaps a devotional painting or sculpture. In January 1508 he supplied gold leaf to the king's painter, Piers, a Flemish artist who may have painted the portrait of James IV now at Abbotsford House. Piers or "Pers" also worked on banners for the tournament of the Wild Knight and the Black Lady and banners for the Edinburgh Hammermen craft.

== Houses in Edinburgh ==
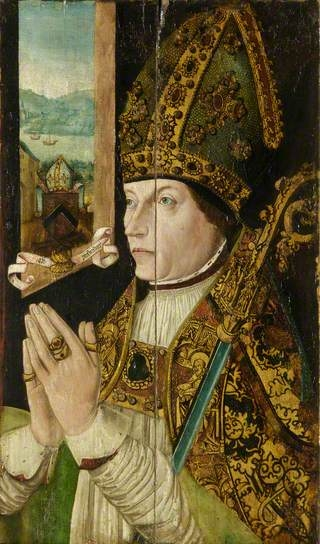
James Hommyll collected William Elphinstone's clock from a Flemish repair workshop

James Hommyll and his wife Helen owned a property on the south side of the High Street in Edinburgh, located within a tenement belonging to Lord Borthwick. On 2 March 1507 they transferred it to their son, and to their daughter Marion Hommyll, if the son died without heirs. The others who occupied "lands" in Lord Borthwick's tenement were Henry Martyne (deceased), John Wilson, Robert Barbour, (deceased), and John Gren. The Hommyll land had rooms on two floors. In September 1511 Hommyll received compensation from Janet Lyell, wife of the baker Robert Anderson, for the burning of his house. Their bakery was located next to Lord Borthwick's tenement, in Henry Rynd's land. It seems that Ellen More and her companions had been lodged in Lord Borthwick's land next to the bakery in the winter of 1504.

In December 1510 Hommyll made over a rental called an "annual rent" from another property on the south side of the High Street, "beyond the Over Bow", for the benefit of the altar of St Anthony in St Giles' Kirk.

== Hommyll and Andrew Halyburton ==
Several Scottish merchants and others had dealings with Andrew Halyburton. Halyburton was a merchant and official stationed at Middelburg in Flanders where he was the "Conservator of the Scottish Staple", or "Conservator of the Scottish privileges in the Low Countries". A notebook or ledger recording his merchant dealings survived in his family and is now held by the National Records of Scotland. Halyburton worked in partnership with Hommyll and called him "his brother".

Homyll travelled to Middelburg and Halyburton would send money back to Scotland with him for his other clients. Hommyll delivered a clock in a new case that Halyburton had ordered to be repaired for the Bishop of Aberdeen, and took some items to England for Halyburton.

Halyburton paid a debt for Hommyll to Jerome Frescobaldi in Antwerp. Frescobaldi supplied textiles to James IV. Hommyll sent gifts of salmon to Frescobaldi, which Halyburton delivered. Halyburton sold Hommyll velvet and dye-stuffs. Hommyll, like many other clients of Halyburton, sent sacks of wool which Halyburton sold to Flanders merchants. Some of the wool was from Melrose, some from (Ettrick) Forest. Some lower quality wool was described as "middling". A large part of Halyburton's business was exchanging Scottish primary products for Flanders luxury goods.
