= Liggeren =

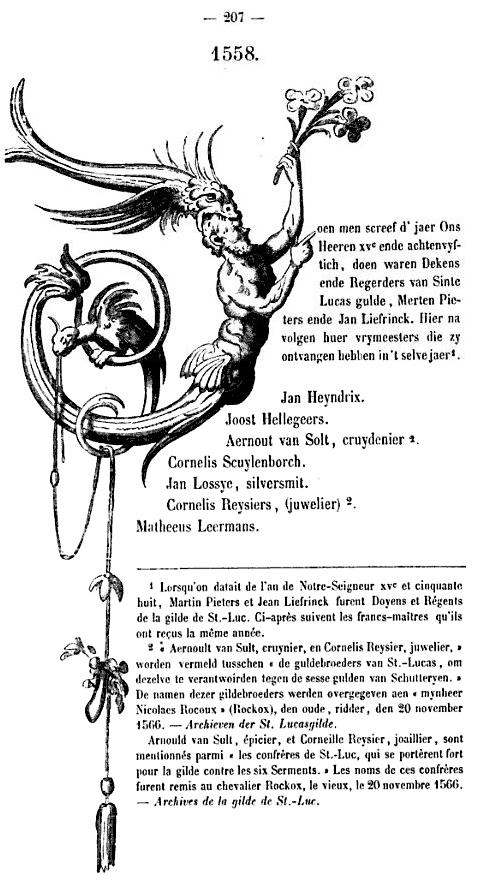
Page representing the year 1558 from the Liggeren.

The Liggeren refers to the archives of the Antwerp Guild of St. Luke.

This important archive is used as a source of biographical information on Flemish artists. For instance, it contained the names of all the harpsichord makers in Antwerp. It also included the dates when artists became masters as well as commissioned works. The archive also provided insights concerning the guild membership of female artists. For instance, the entry on the free master Lysbeth Laureys in 1509 did not indicate her craft specialization but her relationship to a male artist, which in this case was her father identified as Jan. Female artists commonly became members of the guild by inheriting guild rights from their husbands or male relatives.

Various aspects of the Liggeren have been published, most notably in the 19th century.
