= Meynnart Wewyck =

16th-century Netherlandish painter

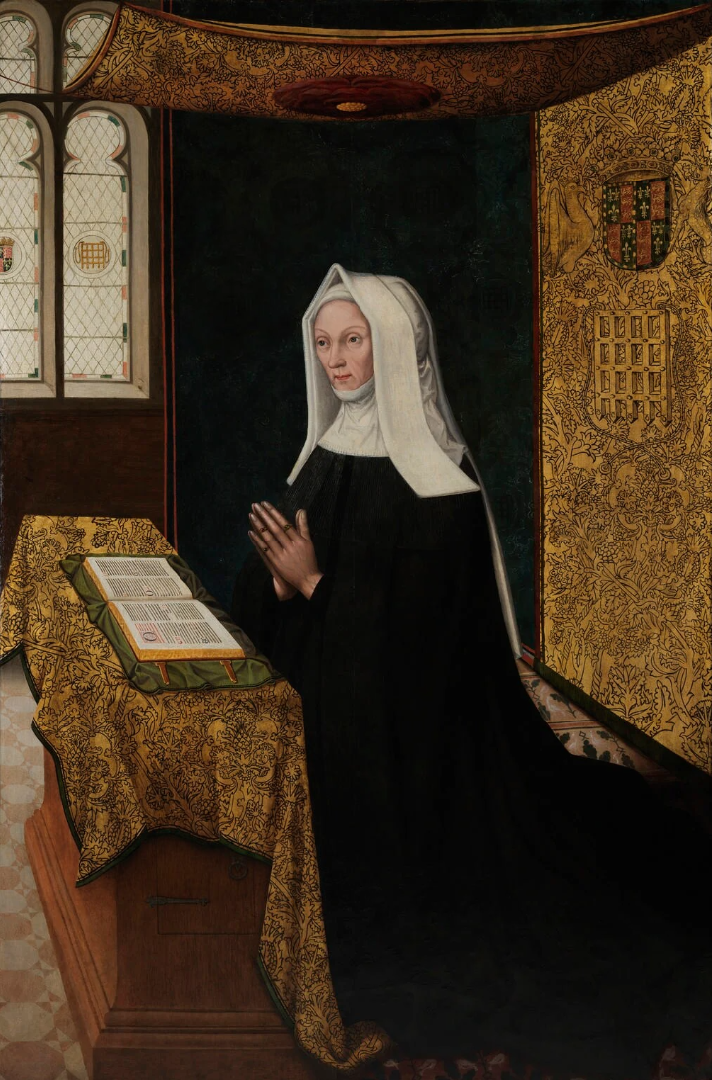
Lady Margaret Beaufort by Meynnart Wewyck, c. 1510, after restoration work in 2023. The Master's Lodge, St John's College, Cambridge

Meynnart Wewyck or Maynard Vewicke was a Netherlandish painter, active c. 1502 to 1525 in England and Scotland, where he was known as "Maynard" and "Mynours". Wewyck was employed as an artist at the court of Henry VII of England and, after his death, by his son Henry VIII. He also spent a brief period at the court of James IV of Scotland. Surviving documentation associates Wewyck with portraits of several members of the royal family, and with drawings for the tomb of Lady Margaret Beaufort, mother of Henry VII, at Westminster Abbey. New research published in 2019 has identified a portrait of Lady Margaret Beaufort in the Master's Lodge at St John's College, Cambridge as by Wewyck, and also attributes a painting of Henry VII at the Society of Antiquaries of London to his hand. In follow-on work, a group of researchers suggests that four surviving portraits of Henry VIII and two of his mother, Elizabeth of York, should also be attributed to Wewyck.

== Career ==
Meynnart Wewyck was one of the earliest artists of the Tudor court and his long career working for Henry VII and Henry VIII is well documented. The richness of this documentation is suggested by the recorded variants of his name. On 19 September 1502 "Mynour, the Inglis payntour" (that is, the painter to the English court) delivered four portraits of the English royal family to James IV of Scotland at Stirling Castle. These included pictures of Henry, Queen Elizabeth of York, Prince Henry (later Henry VIII), and Princess Margaret, who had been married by proxy to James in January 1502.

The Scottish royal accounts record the king's gift of 50 French crowns or £35 Scots to "Mynour, the Inglis payntour" on 10 November. Meynnart Wewyck remained at the Scottish court until November 1503, when he returned to England. The portraits made by Meynnart in Scotland are presumed to be lost. However, drawings included in an album known as the Recueil d'Arras (a collection of drawings made by Le Boucq in c. 1570) may follow them. A portrait of James IV at Abbotsford House bearing the date "1507" has been attributed to Wewyck, and may have been made by "Piers", a painter from Antwerp working in Scotland in that year, perhaps following the model of Meynnart's portrait. The inventory of Henry VIII lists a portrait of James IV presumably by Wewyck.

"Maynard" was paid £1 for pictures in England on 15 March 1505. Lady Margaret Beaufort was the mother of Henry VII and the foundress of St John's College and Christ's College, Cambridge. In 1506, her executors (among them John Fisher, Bishop of Rochester) paid "Maynard Waywike, Duchman" for her likeness; this supports the consensus that the artist was likely Netherlandish. In 1510 Wewyck was hired by the executors to devise a "table" (painting) and "patrones" (pattern drawings) for Lady Margaret's tomb, to be sculpted by Pietro Torrigiano for Henry VII's chapel in Westminster Abbey. Surviving receipts from 1511 and 1512 document payments for this work. One of these records both a typical English variant and Wewyck's own spelling of his name:

M^{d} that I Maynarde Vewike of London paynter haue ressayuid the vii daie of February the thrid yeire of the reigne of kynge henry the viij of the Reuerend father in god bushop of Rochester thre poundes sterlyng in parte of payement of A more some for a certen table and ii patrones drawen for my ladie the kynges grandeam' tombe. In witnes wher. of I the saide Maynarde haue subscribed this bill w^{t} my hand.

— Meynnart Wewyck

Wewyck was recorded as resident in the parish of All Hallows the Great in London in 1523. He was still alive in 1525; the accounts of Henry VIII record a half-yearly payment to "olde maynerd wewoke paynter" in September of that year.

== Works ==
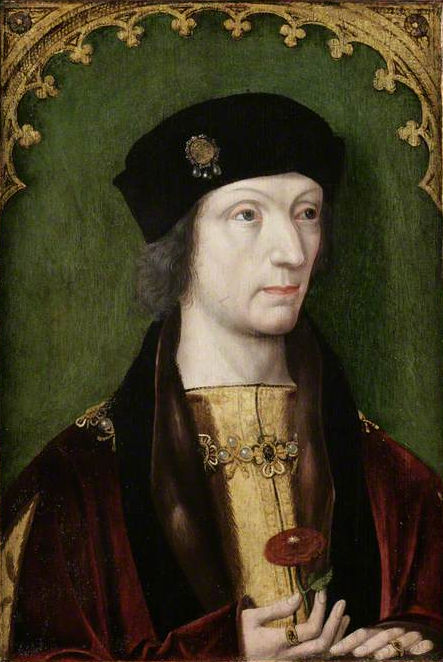
Henry VII, newly attributed to Meynnart Wewyck, Society of Antiquaries of London

As the first painter of portraits appointed by an English king, Wewyck "almost certainly painted the originals" of a widely copied set of similar bust-length portraits of Henry VII, Elizabeth of York, Prince Arthur, Prince Henry and Lady Margaret Beaufort. Henry VII paid him £1 for pictures in March 1505.

However, no surviving paintings could be firmly ascribed to the artist before 2019. On 29 March 2019, St John's College, Cambridge announced that new research had identified a portrait of Lady Margaret Beaufort, mother of Henry VII and foundress of the college, as an original work by Wewyck. The portrait was commissioned c. 1510 (the year after her death) by John Fisher, Bishop of Rochester, and transferred to St John's in 1534, at the time of Rochester's fall from grace. It now hangs in the Master's Lodge at the college. Art historians Charlotte Bolland of the National Portrait Gallery, London and Andrew Chen of St John's published their research in the April 2019 issue of The Burlington Magazine.

Their confident attribution to Wewyck draws on "new archival, scientific and stylistic evidence", including previously unpublished documents, and concludes that the painting is "[p]robably the earliest known large-scale portrait of an English woman". A copy painted by Rowland Lockey c. 1598 preserves details obscured by darkened varnish and paint loss on the original. Based on their work with the portrait of Lady Margaret Beaufort, they also attributed a stylistically and structurally similar portrait of Henry VII held by the Society of Antiquaries of London to Wewyck.

Dr Chen described the significance of these discoveries: “These paintings can serve as touchstones for further research into Wewyck's work. As perhaps the first Netherlandish painter to find work at the Tudor court, Wewyck stands at the beginning of a process of the transfer of artistic skills that would dominate the production of painted portraiture in England throughout the 16th century.”

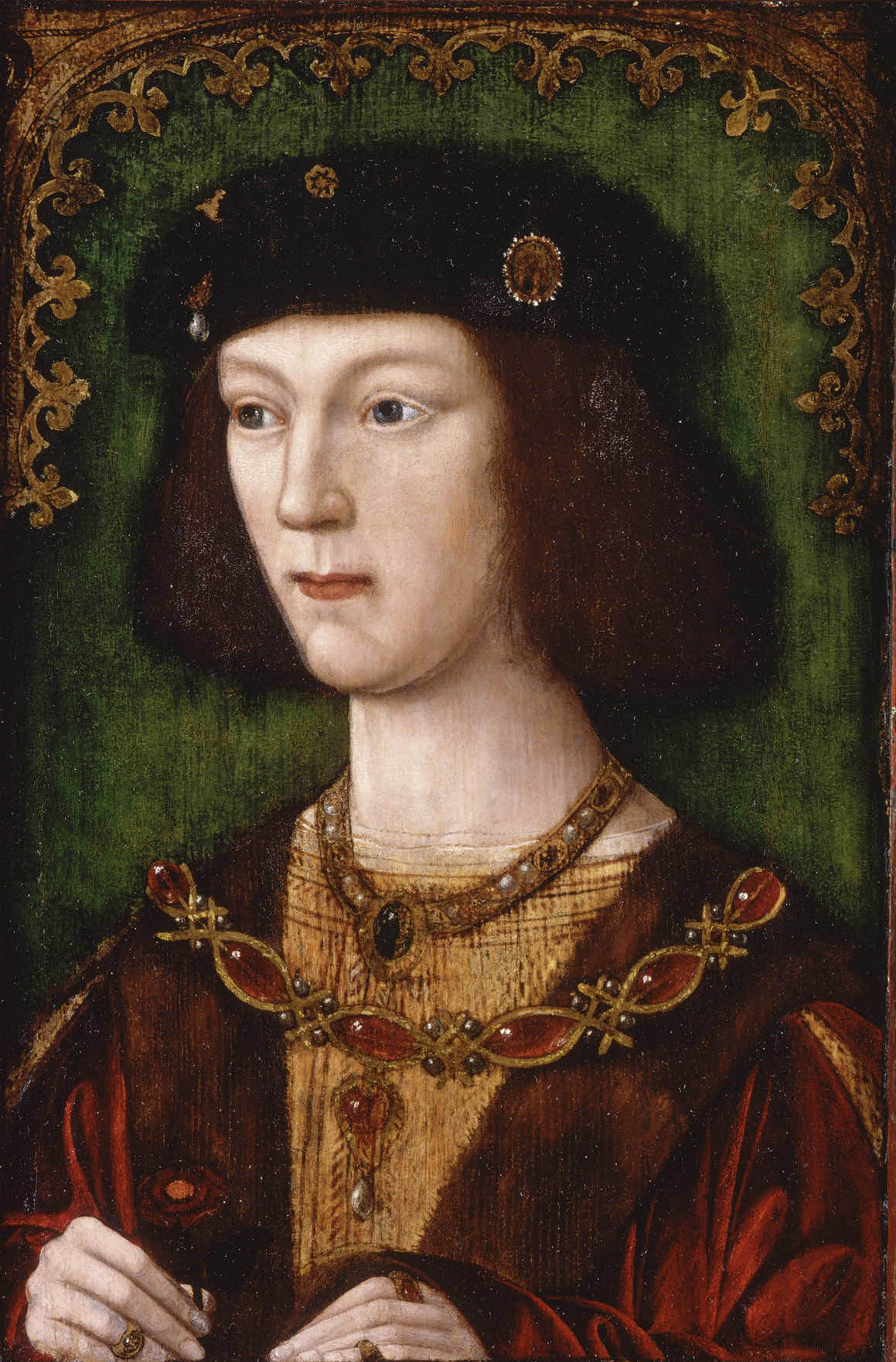
Henry VIII as Prince, c. 1509, Denver Art Museum

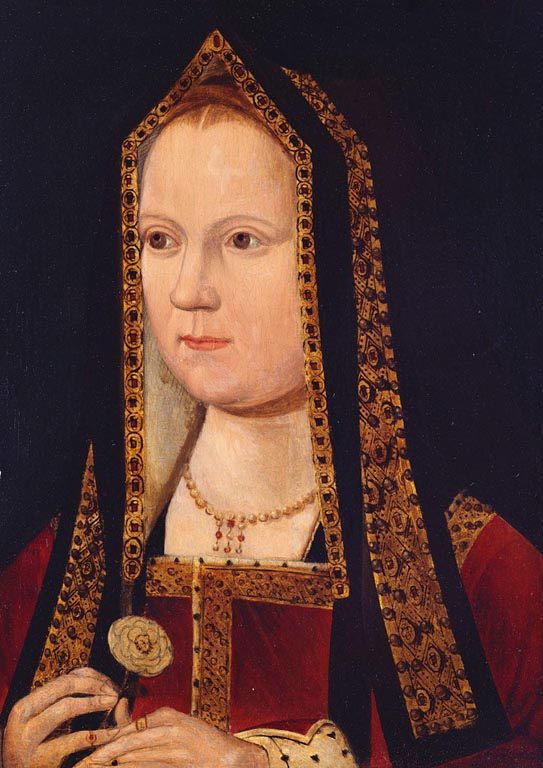
Elizabeth of York, c. 1470 – 1498, Royal Collections Trust

That further research occurred rapidly: later in 2019, a group of specialists from the Yale Center for British Art, with support from the National Portrait Gallery, London, and the Hamilton Kerr Institute, Cambridge, initiated a research project at the Denver Art Museum. Their work identified four portraits of Henry VIII (two as prince and two as king) and two portraits of his mother, Elizabeth of York, which they are "fairly certain" are attributable to Wewyck. Additionally, they determined that the portrait of Henry VII at the Society of Antiquaries, the 1509 portrait of Prince Henry in the Denver Museum of Art, and three other portraits of Henry VIII (one at Anglesey Abbey and two in private collections) were all painted on panels of Baltic oak cut from the same tree.

== Pictures and palaces ==
Originally, portraits were displayed with curtains of fine silk. An inventory of Henry VIII includes a portrait of Lady Margaret Beaufort, described as "the Picture of king Henry VIIth his Mother being Countes of Richmount with a Curten of yellowe and white sarcenet paned togethers", and portraits of Henry VII and Elizabeth of York had similar curtains.

The Great Hall of Richmond Palace was decorated with a series of portraits of English kings, placed between the windows, including Henry VII. It has been suggested that these pictures were the work of Maynard the painter. However, a later description of the hall mentions eleven statues, which were perhaps the series of monarchs mentioned by the earlier writer.
