= Ellen More =

16th-century African servant at the Scottish court

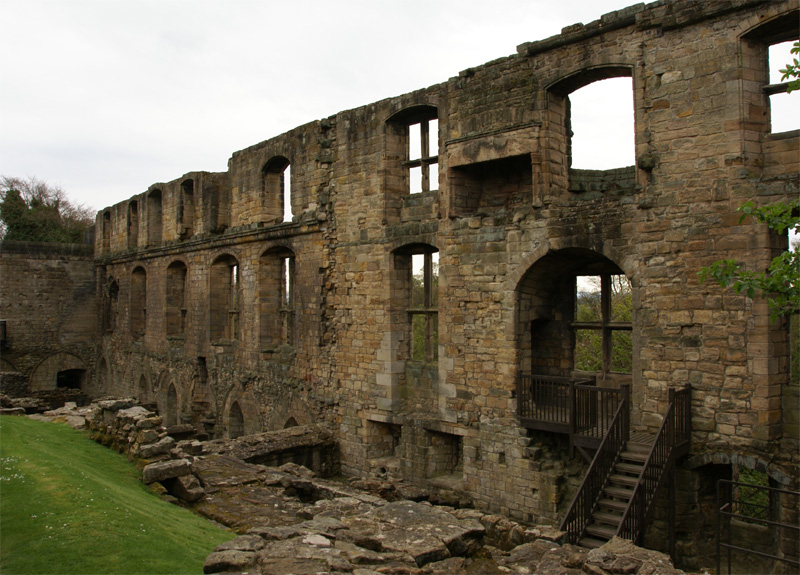
The "More lasses" were at Dunfermline Palace in October 1504

Ellen or Elen More (fl. c. 1500–1535) was an African servant at the Scottish royal court. She probably arrived in Scotland in the company of a Portuguese man with imported animals. There are records of clothing and gifts given to her, although her roles and status are unclear. Some recent scholarship suggests she was enslaved, and her arrival in Scotland can be linked indirectly with the slave trade. She is associated with a racist poem by William Dunbar, and may have performed in Edinburgh as the "Black Lady" at royal tournaments in 1507 and 1508.

== Background ==
Ellen More was employed in Edinburgh Castle in the household of Lady Margaret, the daughter of James IV of Scotland and his mistress Margaret Drummond. Ellen More and Margaret More were later attendants of Margaret Tudor at Linlithgow Palace.

She was first mentioned by name, "Elen More", in the royal accounts in December 1511. Possibly remaining in the household of the young James V, she was last mentioned in the accounts in August 1527, as "Helenor the blak moir". The name "More" recorded in the Scottish accounts seems to be from the word "moor", meaning, in the Scots Language, an African person. A number of individuals are identified as "moors" in the records of the Scottish royal court, and other people of African origin living in Scottish communities are not conspicuous in the records.

=== African people at other European courts ===
Servants of African origin were employed at other courts in Europe at this time. After her marriage to Francesco II Gonzaga in 1490, Isabella d'Este specified a young black girl be obtained or bought to serve her in Mantua, and wrote of another older African girl in her household who was being trained to be a "buffoon" or entertainer. As in Scotland, African and exotic themes featured in pageantry of these courts. Wedding festivities in 1502 at the marriage of Lucrezia Borgia to Alfonso, son of Ercole I d'Este, Duke of Ferrara, included a morisco dance "of Moors with flaming tapers in their mouths and a dance of sauvages". In Spain and in Spanish realms, the names "le More" or "le Négre" could function more as a descriptor than a surname for servants of African origin.

In the same years in England, African servants were recorded in the household of the Spanish princess Catherine of Aragon, the wife of Prince Arthur and Henry VIII, including the trumpeters John Blanke and Alonso de Valdenebro, and a groom Francis Negro. The lawyer Thomas More was surprised by the appearance of Africans in Catherine of Aragon's entourage in procession during her formal Entry to London in November 1501. He wrote about them in racist terms to John Holt. Catherine of Aragon also had a bed chamber servant of Muslim origin, Catalina of Motril, who may have joined her retinue as a slave. In 1501 Juan Davalos of Granada had been paid for a slave for the Princess of Wales, as Catherine was then known. The English and Scottish courts in the 16th century included black people in spectacle and drama.

=== Exotic animals at royal courts ===
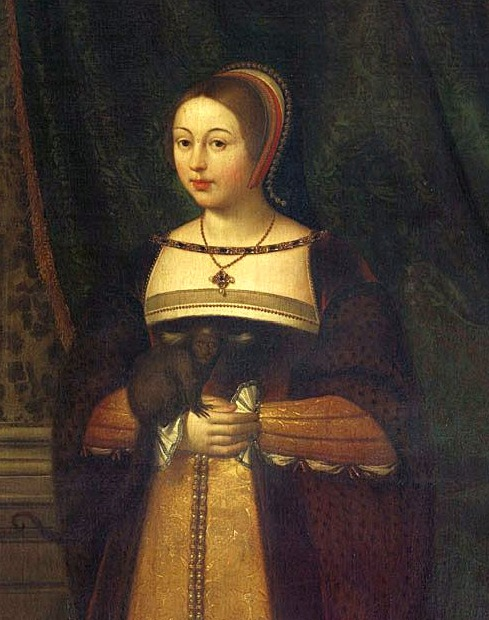
Margaret Tudor, possibly depicted with her pet, the "Marmoset of Calicut", Daniël Mijtens, RCT.

Four African people, described as "More lasses" in Scotland in 1504, were accompanied by a Portuguese man and imported animals including a cat and a horse. The reign of James IV (1488 to 1513) coincided with the era of Portuguese exploration which established firm contact between Europe and Africa. At this time the Portuguese royal court became known for collecting exotic and rare animals from distant lands. Portuguese monarchs sent diplomatic gifts of rare animals to other courts. Henry VII of England received parrots and wild mountain cats at Richmond Palace in 1505 from a Portuguese traveller.

A pet monkey at the Scottish court was recorded as the "Marmoset of Calicut", reflecting Portuguese activity both on the Malabar Coast and on the coast of Brazil.

A letter from a Southampton customs official describes a merchant's plan to present 2 musk cats, 3 little monkeys, a marmoset, and other exotic goods to Henry VIII. A portrait of Margaret Tudor includes a Brazilian marmoset, and may be a copy of a picture once in the collection of Henry VIII, described in his inventory as a "woman having a monkey on her hand". A monkey in a portrait of Catherine of Aragon, painted around 1531, appears to be a pet Marcgrave's capuchin, a type brought from Brazil by Portuguese traders. Catharine's portrait may follow an allegory of Christian faith. Gifts of monkeys or marmosets were made at the English court in 1534 and 1535, but it was said that Anne Boleyn did not care for "such beasts".

=== Scotland, Portugal, and privateers ===
James IV licensed Scottish privateers like Andrew Barton to attack Portuguese shipping by "letter of marque". The context was a dispute about the loss of a valuable cargo at Sluis belonging to John Barton of Leith back in the reign of James III. The Scottish kings gave Barton and his successors letters of reprisal to recover the loss. James IV and James V continued to send reminders to Manuel I of Portugal. Privateer activity may have provided a potential route for African people to reach Scotland, although there is no direct evidence of this.

Archival references to the "More lasses", a Portuguese man, and exotic animals were re-discovered in the early 19th century by William MacGregor Stirling (1771-1833) and others. A privateer connection between the "More lasses" and the Barton family was suggested by Patrick Fraser Tytler. He conjectured that the African presence at the Scottish court was due to "the success of the Scottish privateers".

James IV had other connections to Portuguese shipping and exploration and maintained trading links. He employed Portuguese craftsmen in his shipyards, and was a patron of an Italian merchant and financier in Bruges Jerome Frescobaldi, whose company funded voyages. Frescobaldi sold James IV spices obtained by Portuguese merchant ships. James IV bought wax, wine, and a grounded ship on the west coast from a Portuguese merchant, John Farnhae, in April 1498.

These African people have been described as "human booty" in terms of their relationship with the Portuguese Empire. While details of their journeys and arrival in Scotland remain obscure, the accounts of the treasurer and comptroller of Scotland record the employment of African people at the court of James IV. The Scottish royal household included "Peter the More" and the "More taubronar", a drummer who travelled around Scotland in the king's retinue.

== Ellen More in the archival record ==
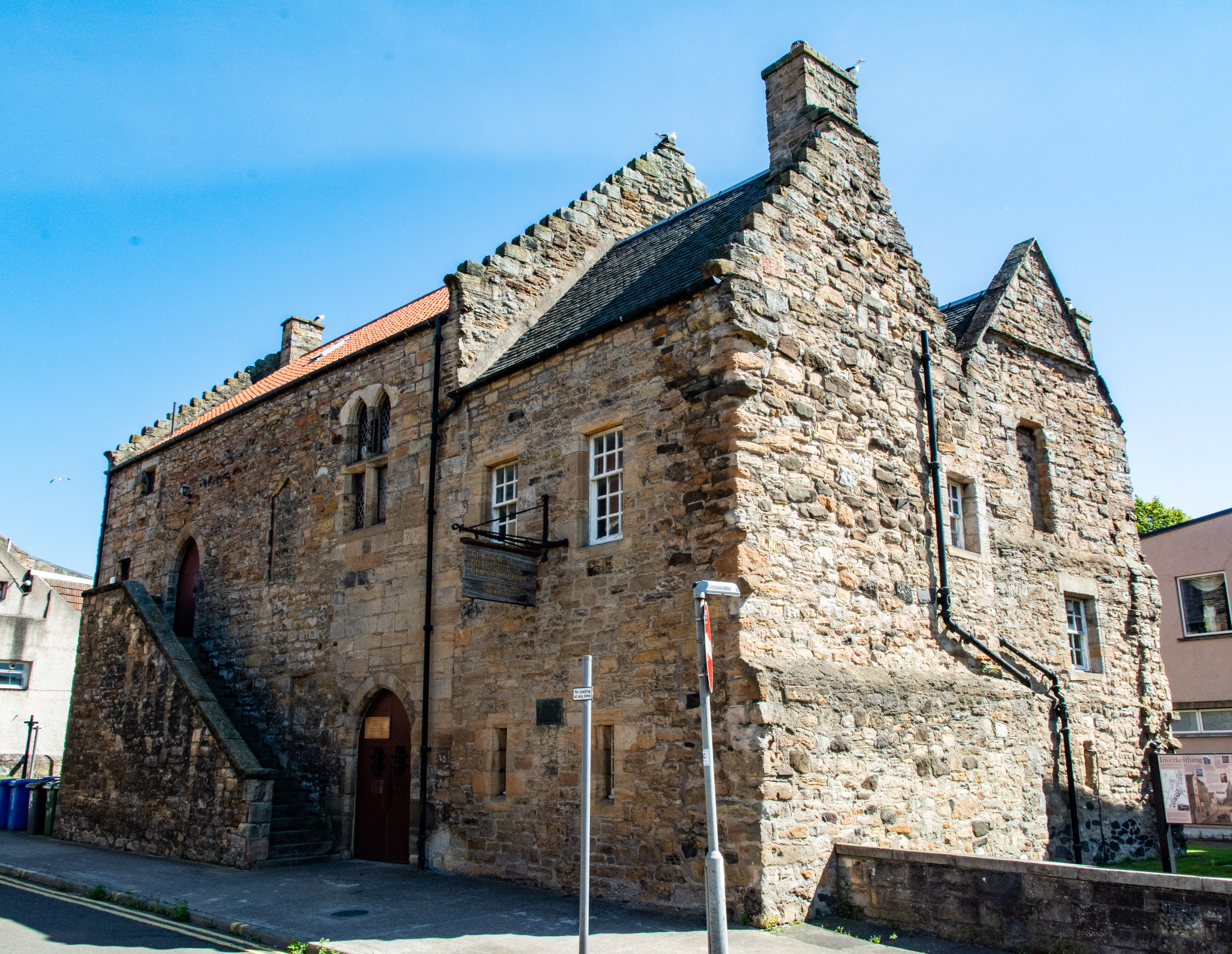
The "More lasses" moved to Inverkeithing, possibly to the Hospitium of the Grey Friars

=== The More Lasses in Dunfermline and Inverkeithing ===
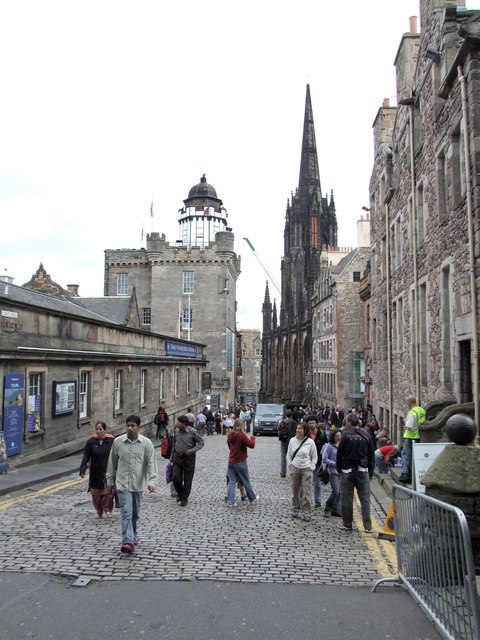
The "More lasses" stayed with James Hommyll on the south side of Castlehill on Edinburgh's High Street in November 1504

In October 1504 Margaret Tudor was at Dunfermline Palace, across the Forth from Edinburgh in Fife. James IV was in the north at Elgin. There was a suspected outbreak of plague at Dunfermline. The queen and her household decided to leave Dunfermline. Four African women, called "More lasses", went to North Queensferry and Inverkeithing on 8 November, looked after by the court apothecary, John Mosman. There were also "folkis with them" at Inverkeithing, people accompanying the "lasses" and some animals. After a few days, they went on to Edinburgh. The accounts record that a woman "tursit" the "More lasses" from Dunfermline, a word that usually means the packing and transport of household goods with cord but can also mean the transport of people.

=== Edinburgh ===
James IV arrived in Edinburgh, and came to Holyrood Palace by 18 November, where on 22 November he rewarded a man who had brought animals with 20 gold crowns, these animals had been with the African women, the "More lasses", at Inverkeithing. They included a Portuguese horse with a red tail, and a civet or "must cat".

On 26 November, James IV gave the woman who had brought the "More lasses" from Fife 4 shillings. On 27 November James IV ordered that two suspected plague victims, who had been excluded from Dunfermline town, should have 14 shillings.

The four African people, recorded by a clerk as "Ethiopians", were first lodged in the house of James Hommyll, a wealthy Edinburgh merchant who bought tapestries for the king. Hommyll also hosted the Portuguese man who was escorting the African people and had brought them to Scotland with the two horses and other animals. They stayed with James Hommyll and his wife Helen for 40 days. The clerk recorded the payments as "extra domicilium", meaning the expenses of royal servants residing away from the royal household for a time. The Latin record may be translated:

Et pro expensis quatuor personarum Ethiopum remanentium extra domicilium de mandato regis, iij li.
Et per solutionem factam Jacobem Hommill pro expensis unius portingalie portantis quatuor personas Ethiopum, duos equos, et animalia, extranea domino regi remanentes apud Edinburgh per quadraginti dies in domicilio dicti Jacobi de mandato regis, xviij li iiij s.

And, for the expenses of four Ethiopian persons remaining outside the household, by the hand of the king, £4.
And to pay James Hommill for the Portuguese man bringing four Ethiopian people, two horses, and the animals, remaining outside the household in Edinburgh for forty days in the said James's house, by the hand of the king, £18 and 4 shillings.

Property records mention that James Hommyll's house or land was on the south side of the High Street in the tenement of Lord Borthwick beyond the Over Bow, near to Edinburgh Castle. The street is now called Castlehill. Homyll's house was damaged by a fire in 1511 that started in a bakery. The king had sent his brother, William Hommyll, on an errand to Portugal in December 1503, a connection to Portuguese trade and shipping.

=== William Wod ===
In July 1505 a Leith mariner and timber merchant William Wod received a reward of £12 Scots from the king for bringing the African people to the Scottish court accompanied by the white horse from Portugal, a jennet horse, and a must cat. No reason is given for the later date of this reward. It remains unclear if the mariner Wod had brought the Africans and the Portuguese man to Scotland from a ship he captured under "letters of Marque" or whether the King had requested him to obtain the African people to be his servants, attendants to his daughter Lady Margaret. The apothecary Mosman came to Stirling Castle on 6 November to fetch the must cat.

=== Baptism and naming ===
One "More las" was christened on 11 December 1504, and probably given a new name. Perhaps this marked the end of the stay at James and Helen Homyll's house when the "More lasses" returned to the royal household. Ellen More may have been renamed after a courtier, Eleanor Pole, or Helen of Troy, and her sister named Margaret after the queen. There was another "Eleanor" in the household, Eleanor Johns. Ellen was a very common choice of girl's name in Early Modern Scotland, as later baptismal records show. The historian Bernadette Andrea notes that Ellen More and other African people arriving in Scotland and Britain in the 16th-century may have followed the Islamic faith. The age of these arrivals is unclear, a "lass" could be as old as a teenager, as the word was most commonly used.

=== Ellen More ===
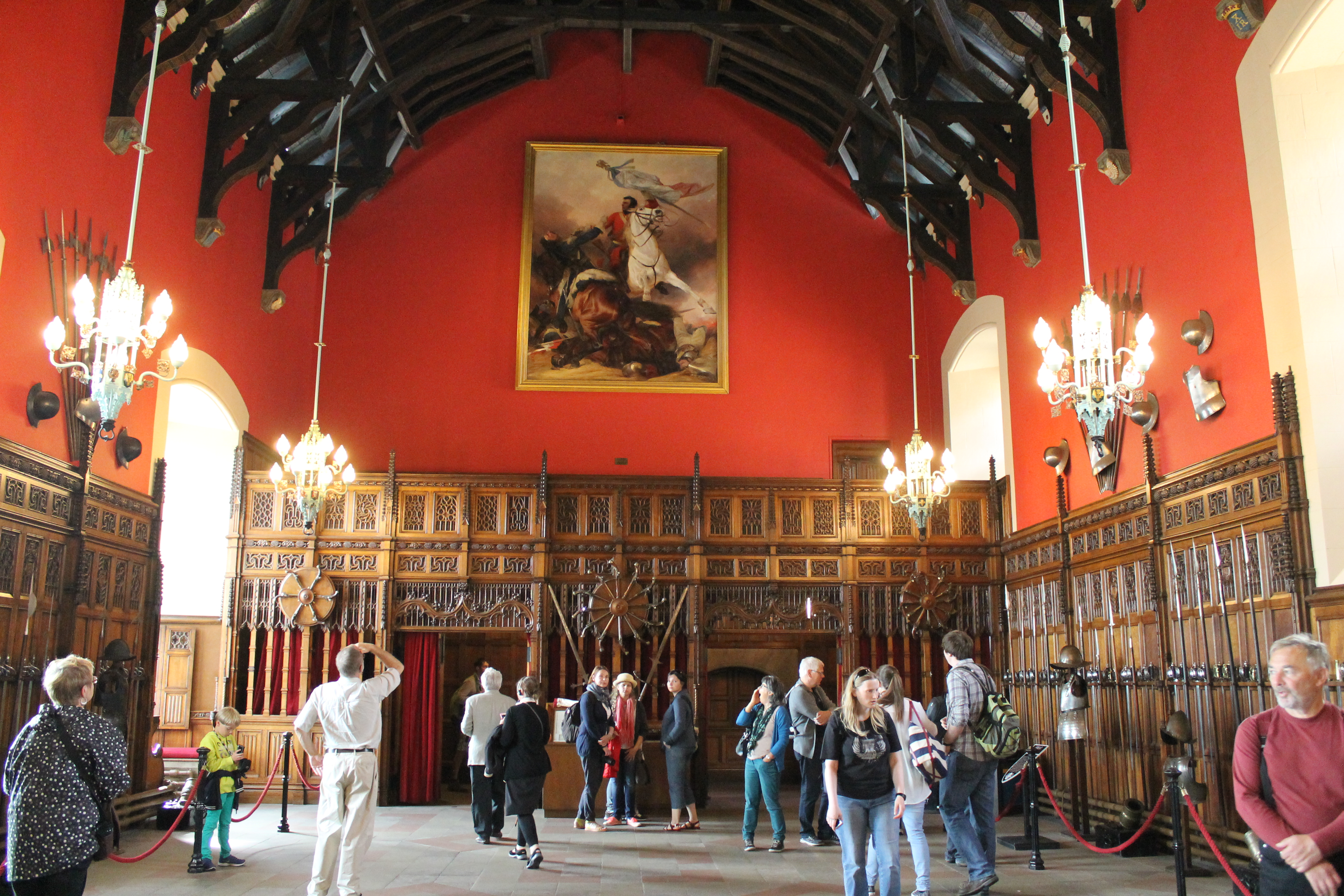
Ellen and Margaret More were attendants of the king's daughter Lady Margaret in Edinburgh Castle

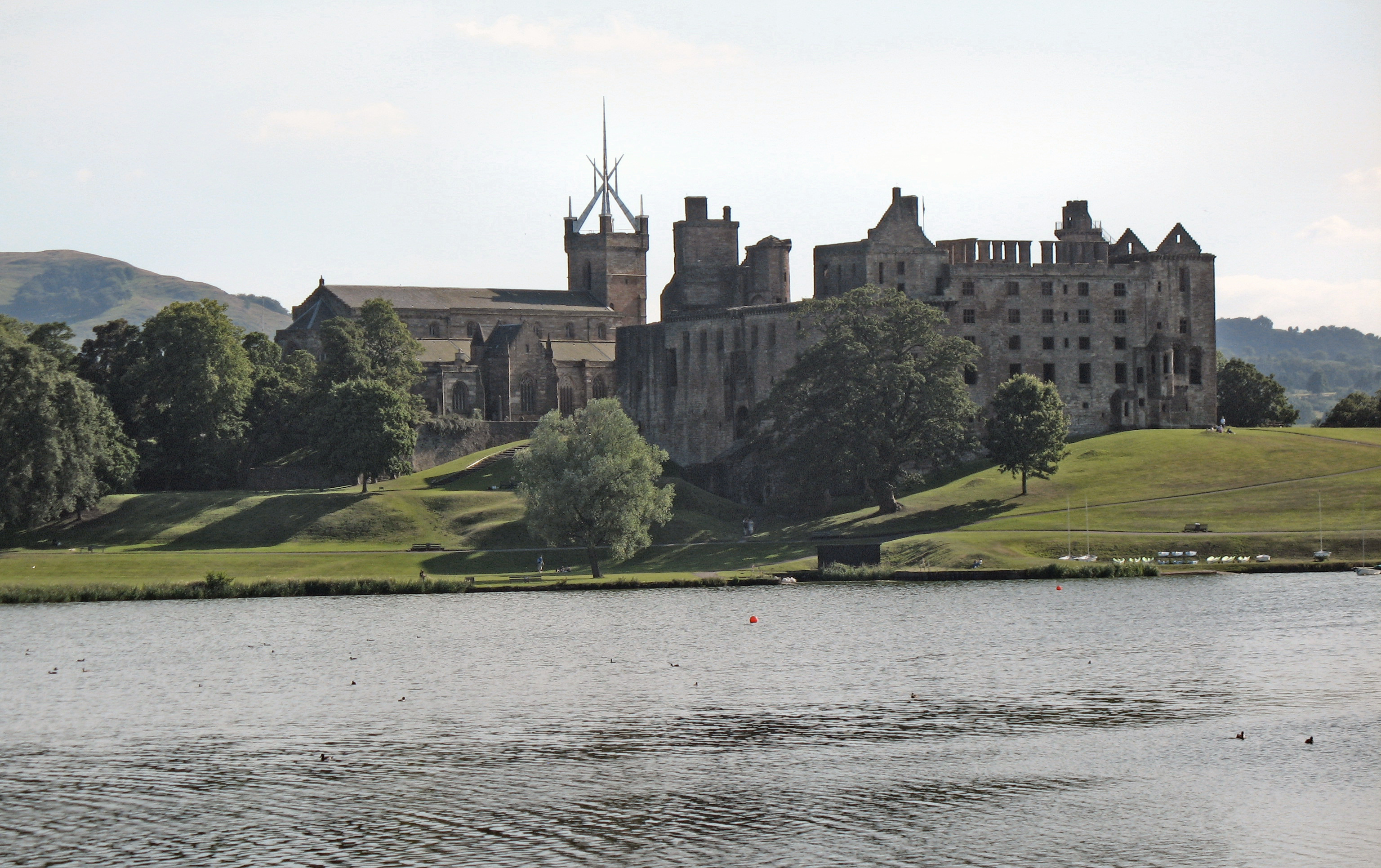
Ellen More and Margaret More were members of the household of Margaret Tudor at Linlithgow Palace

These records concerning the "More lasses" in 1504 may refer to the arrival of Ellen, and also Margaret More, another servant who was perhaps Ellen's sister. Ellen and Margaret seem to be the two "More lassis" at Edinburgh Castle who attended Lady Margaret and were bought shoes. The shoemaker was John Davidson, who also made shoes for "Little Martin the Spaniard" and the Danish noble, Christopher or Christiern, said to be a son of Elizabeth of Denmark, but his identity remains unclear. The keeper of Edinburgh castle, Alexander McCulloch of Myreton, was paid £100 in 1505 for keeping the king's daughter with Margery Lindsay, "and the Moris and servandis".

In 1506 Ellen and Margaret were both given gowns of russet cloth with velvet bands, with red skirts or kirtles. In 1507 they, and another girl in the castle, Marjory Lindsay, were given red skirts with green ribbons.

In later years they joined the court of Margaret Tudor and were bought clothes, and given New Year's day gifts, comparable to those given to the queen's English lady in waiting, Mistress Musgrave. Ellen is known to have worked for the queen at Linlithgow Palace. This is an example from the accounts of a New Year's Day gift of money, five French gold crowns worth £3-10s Scots, given to Ellen More on 1 January 1512 at Holyrood Palace; "Item, to Elene Moire, v Franch crounis, iij li x s." The same amount was given to two "maidens", servants of Elizabeth Barlow, Lady Elphinstone. Elizabeth Sinclair got 10 crowns.

Ellen or Elen More was first mentioned by name in the royal account for December 1511. She was given her livery clothes, an allowance of clothing given to many royal servants in the days before Christmas, on 15 December 1511. Gifts of clothes and livery clothes were often more valuable than the fees or salaries given to servants, or the gifts of money received. Costume was a marker of membership of the court. The value and type of clothing received can be indication of relative status.

Ellen More's clothing included a gown made of "Rissillis broun" (russet cloth from Rijsel or Lille) trimmed with velvet, with yellow taffeta sleeves, a velvet hood, and skirt of English brown or russet woollen cloth with a crimson hem. French russet cloth for a gown, Scottish black for a kirtle, and linen for "sarks" or smocks were bought for the Queen's "blak madin" in December 1512. Margaret More is mentioned less often in the accounts, but she was at Linlithgow Palace in April 1512, when James V of Scotland was born. The "two black ladies" were given 10 gold crowns on 1 January 1513. The historian Imtiaz Habib connects this reference to Ellen and Margaret More as black ladies to the earlier Black Lady tournaments.

The king's daughter, Lady Margaret Stewart married John Gordon, Lord Gordon and then Sir John Drummond of Innerpeffray.

Ellen More was given 40 shillings in July 1527, recorded as a payment to "Helenor, the blak moir". No further details of the lives of Ellen and Margaret More are known for certain.

== Of Ane Blak-Moir ==
William Dunbar wrote a poem for the court of James IV with the title Of Ane Blak-Moir which describes the appearance of a black woman involved in a tournament in unflattering and racist terms. David Laing seems to have been the first writer to connect Dunbar's poem with the archival rediscovery of Ellen More and the African presence at the Scottish court of James IV.

James IV staged two elaborate tournaments called "The justing of the wyld knicht for the blak lady", held in June 1507 and again in May 1508. The part of the "Black Lady" was played by a woman of the court. and James IV was the Wild or Black Knight, a character based on one of King Arthur's knights of the Round Table who had been brought up in a forest. A later 16th-century author, Robert Lindsay of Pitscottie, wrote, "The king iustit [jousted] him selff dissaguysed onknawin and he was callit the blak knicht".

It is not clear if William Dunbar's poem was directly connected to these events, or that Ellen More played the part of the Black Lady in the tournaments. The identity of Ellen, or Elen More, is discussed in scholarship as the subject of Dunbar's poem, the woman named in the accounts, and the actor in the tournaments. Martin the Spaniard, who appears in the accounts linked with the "More lasses" in payments for their shoes, performed with the Black Lady at the tournament banquet. The role of the Black Lady as a prize was perhaps not unusual in the conventions of medieval tournament, but seems also to emphasise a chattel status for an African performer.

The opening lines of Dunbar's poem refer to the arrival of the woman in Scotland on a ship, which may suggest that such arrivals were not uncommon. Dunbar explains that he writes in contrast to his previous poems describing white women of the court. The poem "creates a very unfavourable contrast between black female physiology and that of white ladies at court";

Lang have I made of ladies white,
Now of ane black I will indite,
That landit furth of the last ships,
Who fain I would descrive perfyte.

== The Black Lady Tournaments ==
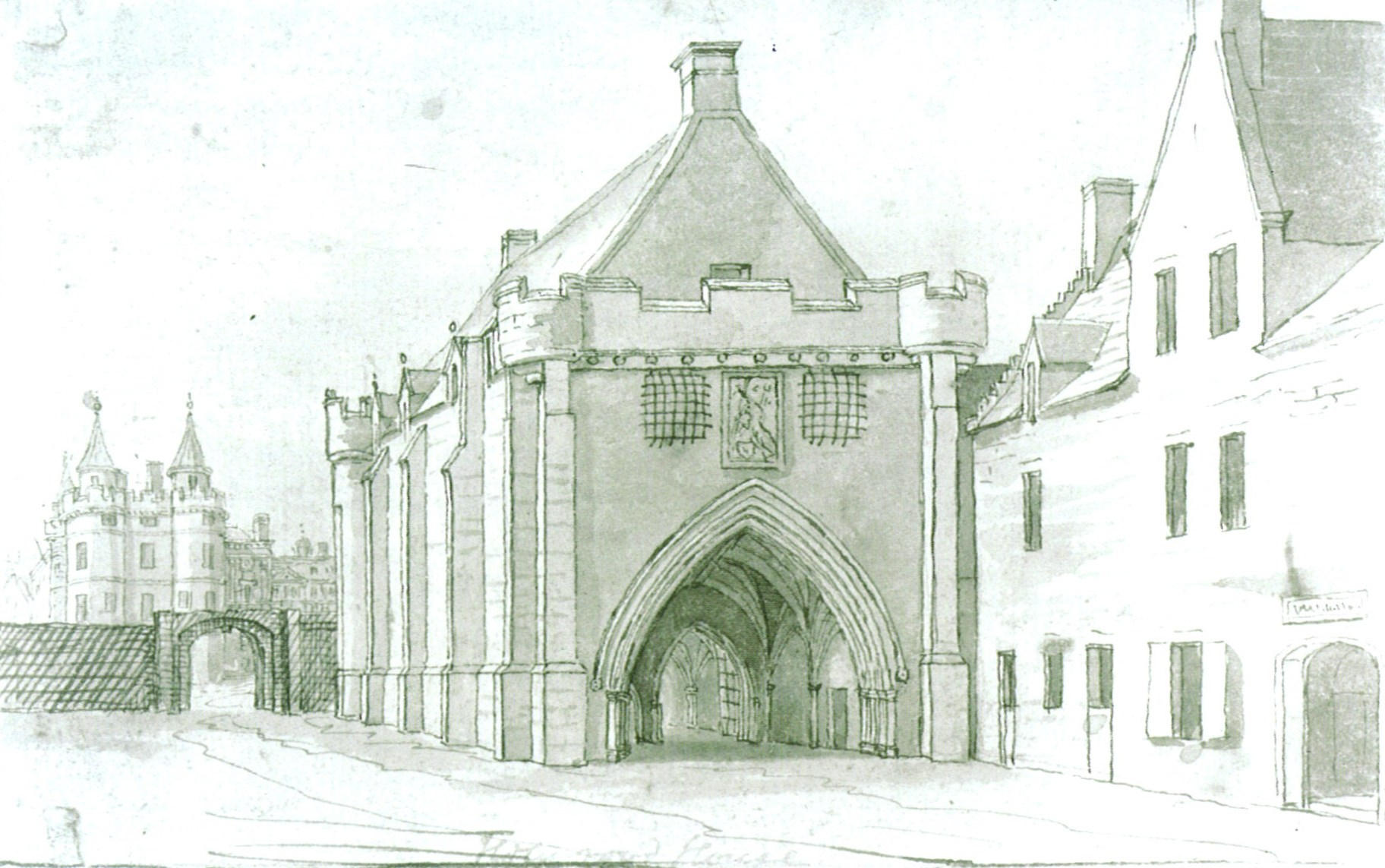
At the end of the tournament banquet the "Black lady" vanished in a cloud, a theatrical device contrived in the Great Hall of Holyroodhouse by a French soldier of the royal artillery and Andrew Forman. The hall was newly converted from the old refectory of Holyrood Abbey.

The expenditure on these lavish events, imitating the "Round Table of King Arthur of England", was recorded in the treasurer's accounts, and the tournaments were described in Scottish chronicles. The invitation to the tournament sent to France was illuminated with gold leaf. It was issued by the Marchmont Herald on behalf of the 'Chevalier Sauvage à la Dame Noire', the Wild Knight to the Black Lady, and gave details of the events to be held at Edinburgh. Bluemantle or Rothesay Herald, sent abroad in March 1507 with news of the birth of James, Duke of Rothesay, may have carried the invitation to the courts of France, Spain, and Portugal.

The Black Lady's gown was made from Flanders damask figured with gold flowers, bordered with yellow and green taffeta, with outer sleeves of black gauze called "plesance", inner sleeves, a drape of the same black gauze about her shoulders and arms, and she wore long gloves of black chamois or "semys" leather. She had two lady companions dressed in gowns of green Flanders taffeta edged with yellow.

William Ogilvy and Alexander Elphinstone, probably Alexander Elphinstone, 1st Lord Elphinstone, dressed in English white damask as the "Squires of the Black Lady" and escorted her from Edinburgh Castle to the field of the tournament. She was carried in a "triumphal chair" draped with Flanders taffeta with appliqué flowers. Antoine d'Arces was the "White Knight". James IV himself played the part of the Wild or Savage Knight. The horses pulling the pageant carts and triumphal chairs were dressed with rich fabrics. One horse was disguised as a unicorn, with a caparison of black and white damask lined with canvas. The Black Lady was carried (in her triumphal chair) by 12 men from Edinburgh Castle to the tournament ground beneath the castle and to Holyrood Palace. "Wild men" at the course or barriers were dressed in goat skins and wore hart horns from Tullibardine. In 1508 the Black Lady's costume was renewed with a green woollen skirt, and new black leather sleeves and gloves. Her two maidens wore Bruges satin.

On the first day of the first week of the five week-long event, challengers were to assemble at the "Tree of Esperance" at the tournament ground beneath the castle, where the Black Lady kept the week's white shield, accompanied by the wild men. Combats and jousts were scored by judges and the ladies, women of Margaret Tudor's household and the court. The tree of Esperance or Hope was decorated with artificial flowers, pears, and painted heraldic shields, moulded in leather by Simon Glasford, a buckler-maker. In England, Margaret Tudor attended a Christmas 1516 banquet where a garden of Esperance or Hope was presented as a stage set for a masque inside the hall of Greenwich Palace.

Events concluded with three days of banqueting at Holyroodhouse. There was a masque and a dance organised by Lady Musgrave, Mistress of the Queen's Wardrobe. The Black Lady came into the hall with Martin the Spaniard who was equipped with an archery bow and dressed in yellow. A cloud descended from the roof and swept them both away.

== Africans represented in court drama ==
Records of 16th-century court and civic drama include both performers of African origin and performers wearing costumes representing imagined African people or "moors". In 1504 and 1505 James IV employed an African drummer known as the "More taubronar". James IV travelled with him and four Italian minstrels on his trip to the north to Darnaway and Elgin. The drummer devised a masque or dance for the tournament held on Shrove-Tide, called "Fasterins Eve". Twelve dancers wore costumes in black and white fabrics. The "taubronar" was paid a fee, an annual salary, of the same value as that paid to another drummer, Guilliam, and to Margaret Tudor's English attendant Mistress Elizabeth Barley, who later married Lord Elphinstone.

Later Stewart court festivities and drama with African actors and actors portraying Africans, include; the Entry of Mary, Queen of Scots into Edinburgh in 1561, the wedding of Mary, Queen of Scots, and Henry, Lord Darnley in July 1565, the baptism of James VI at Stirling in December 1566, the Entry of Anne of Denmark to Edinburgh (1590), the baptism of Prince Henry (1594), and The Masque of Blackness (1605). Clare McManus identifies "markers of difference, foreigness and liminality" and "compact symbols of blackness and femininity initially encapsulated in the body of the Black Lady" of James IV's tournaments which reappeared at the baptism of Prince Henry, and were suited to Scottish conventions of court theatre and performance. A "threat of diversity" was defused through theatrical representation.

=== Use of black fabrics ===
The costume of the "Black Lady" at James IV's tournaments included a black lightweight fabric called "plesance" around her arms. Costume used at court in England in this period had some similarities: two female courtiers performing in a masque in 1510 covered their arms and faces with a similar black fabric, "lumberdynes, whiche is marveillous thinne, so that the same ladies seem to be nigrost or blacke Mores". The revels accounts describe the costume as "moryans" or "morryans" fashion, also noting that the black "lumberdynes" fabric was used to cover heads, necks, faces, and arms. Such use of fabric in early modern theatre has been described as a "chromatic materiality".

At the court of Edward VI of England, actors in masques were dressed as "Mores" with long black velvet gloves reaching above the elbow, with bells attached to costumes made from goat's skins. Such revels costumes at the English court were designed and made by an Italian artist, Niccolo da Modena. He made wigs or "perukes" of hair used by female actors disguised as "Mores". Edward VI dressed as a "Moor" at a Shrovetide masque in 1548. Black velvet was for costuming a "Maske of Moores" at the coronation of Elizabeth I, or in her first year of reign, and the painter William Lyzard worked on a "More's Masque" for Elizabeth I in 1579. The use of black sleeves, gloves, and fabrics as part of the costume in Edinburgh at the tournaments of James IV has raised some doubt that the vanishing Black Lady was played by an African performer.

=== Later court drama and theatre ===
A contemporary description of the 1590 Edinburgh event by a Danish observer distinguished between townspeople who wore masks and had painted legs and arms, and "an absolutely real and native blackamoor". An African servant at the Scottish court was buried at Falkland in July 1591. It is not clear if he was the participant in 1590 Entry of Anne of Denmark. An African performer appeared to pull a pageant cart in the Great Hall of Stirling Castle at the baptism feast in August 1594.

In Shakespeare's Othello, Desdemona recalls her mother's maidservant, a Moorish woman called "Barbary". Barbary had lost her love, a man who had lost his mind, and she sang a song of mourning and loss called "Willow". The play was performed at Whitehall Palace on 1 November 1604. Anne of Denmark and her ladies performed in black face in the Masque of Blackness in the same space on 6 January 1605. Kim F. Hall draws attention to The Masque of Blackness and the documented reactions of its audience, in the context of the "growth of actual contact with Africans, Native Americans, and other ethnically different foreigners" and a "collision of the dark lady tradition with the actual African difference encountered in the quest for empire".

== Representation in Media ==
Ellen More is featured in a short animation titled "The Tournament of the African Lady", which also depicts John Blanke, a trumpeter at the English court, written and directed by Jason Young.

The story of Ellen More forms the basis of a stageplay James IV: Queen of the Fight, written by Rona Munro for performance in 2022.

== See also ==
- Moors
- Kammermohr
