= African presence at the Scottish royal court =

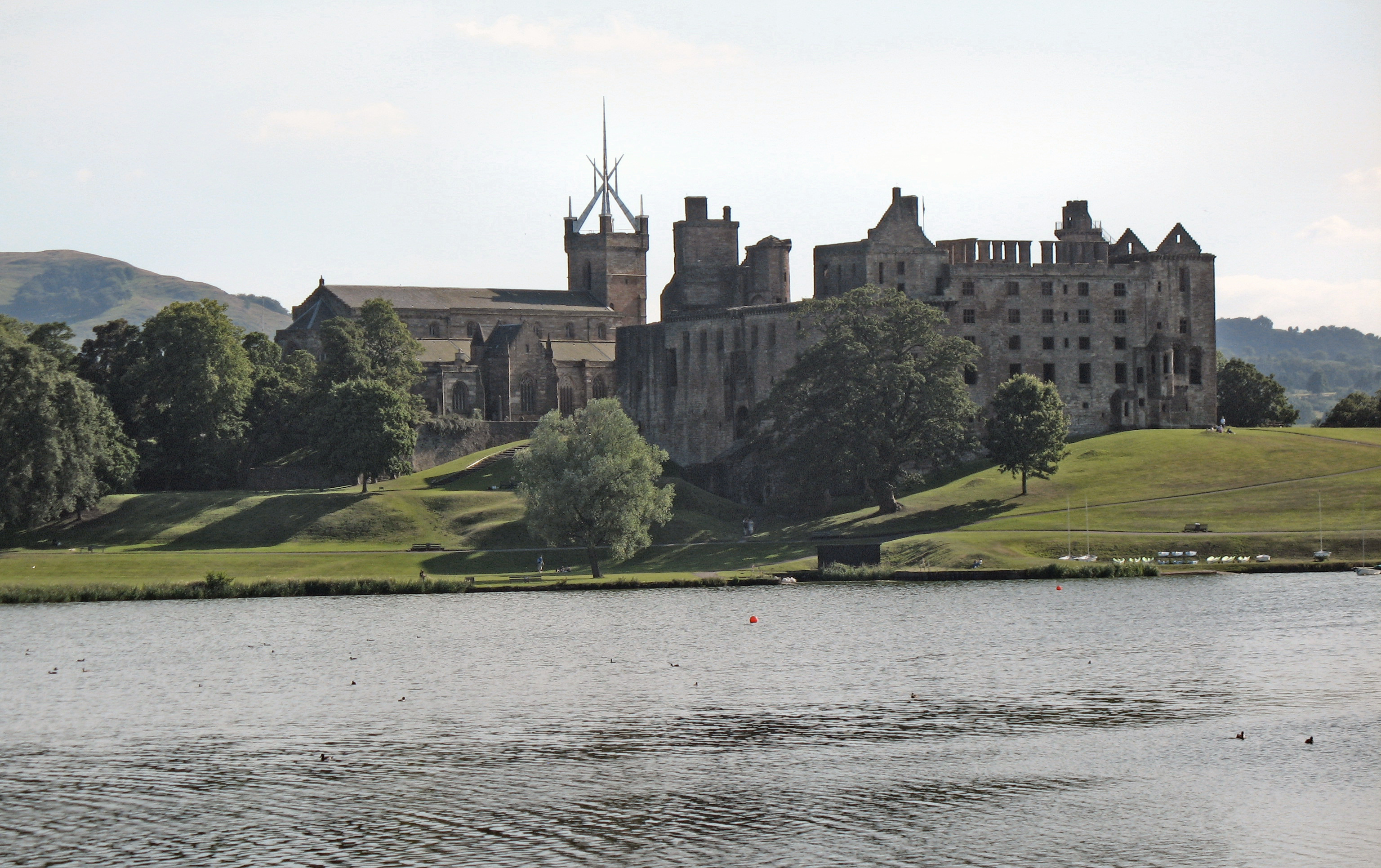
Ellen More and Margaret More were members of the household of Margaret Tudor at Linlithgow Palace

A number of people of African origin were recorded as servants at the Royal Court of Scotland during the 16th century, forming a notable African presence at the Scottish royal court. The accounts include gifts of clothing. The American scholar Kim F. Hall has characterised their role at court as "dehumanised alien curiosities", and their histories, roles at court, and their relationships with communities, are the subject of continuing research and debate.

== The "More lasses" ==
In the original records written in the Scots language, the word "More" or "Moir" refers to people of African origin. An early reference to people of African origin at the Scottish court relates to a group of young women or children in November 1504, recorded as the "More lasses". They were accompanied by a Portuguese man, and a woman was rewarded for bringing them from Dunfermline Palace to Edinburgh. One record, written in Latin, calls this group "four persons of Ethiopia".

== Ellen More ==
Subsequent accounts of the Scottish treasurer, from 1511 onwards, mention Ellen More and Margaret More, as servants of Margaret Tudor. Ellen More was given clothes and gifts on New Year's Day like other courtiers. Ellen More has been identified with the part of the "Black Lady" in the tournaments of James IV of Scotland, and as the subject of a racist poem by William Dunbar, Of Ane Blak-Moir, who had arrived in Scotland on the "latest ships". Her story was the basis of a character in a 2022 stage play, James IV - Queen of the Fight, by Rona Munro.

== Other identities ==
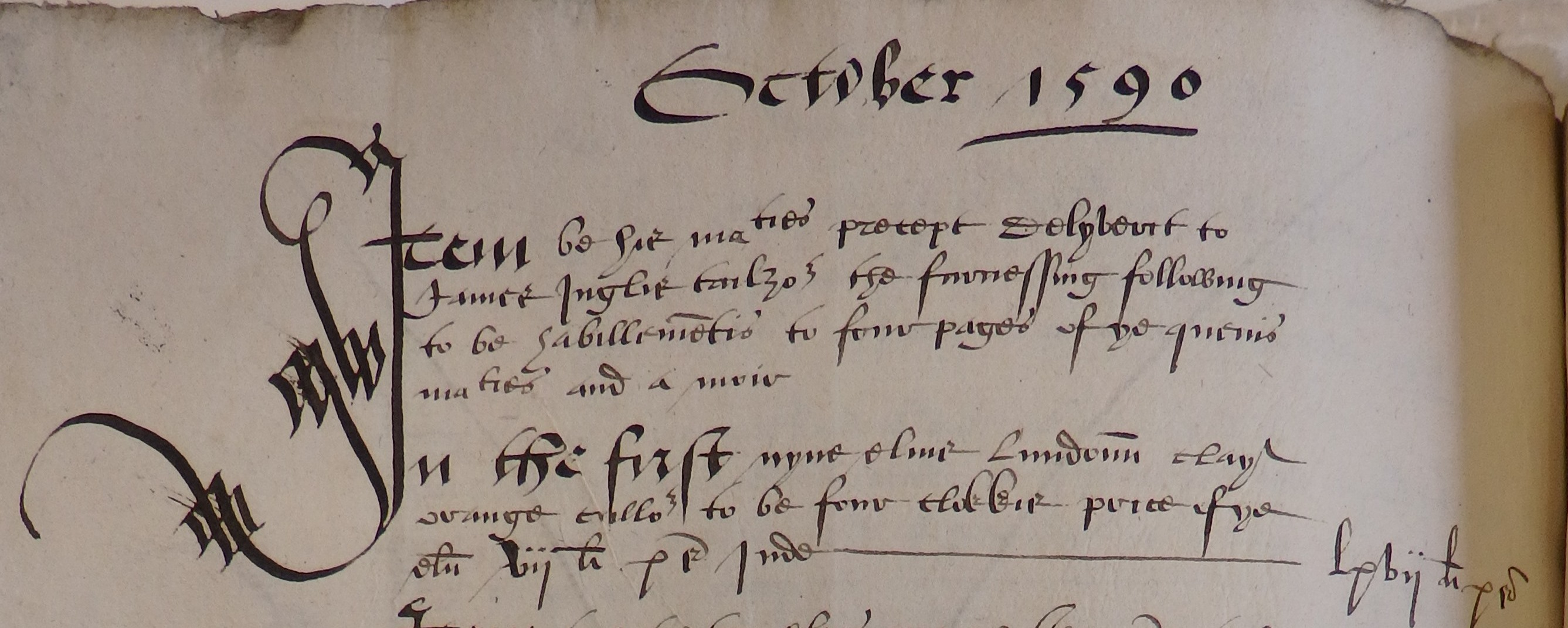
A record of costume bought for the "Moir" servant in 1590, from the Scottish treasurer's accounts

Other servants of African origin who received payments from James IV include; the musician and drummer known as the "More taubronar", whose name has not been discovered; Peter the Moor; and a group known as the "Moor friars".

The Rough Wooing, a war between England and Scotland, brought the soldier Pedro de Negro and a cavalryman known as the "Spanish moor" to Scotland. Mariotta Haliburton, a Scottish aristocrat, wrote that the "Spanish moor" was "as sharp a man as rides".

Other people identified as "Moors" are noted in a record known as the "Bread Book" of Mary of Guise. Nageir the Moor received payments from Regent Moray. Anne of Denmark, queen consort of James VI and I, had servants of African origin, and, during her time in Scotland, people of African origin performed in court drama, including her Royal Entry to Edinburgh and the masque at the baptism of Prince Henry.

In 1603, at the Union of the Crowns, James and Anne of Denmark moved to London, and the culture of the Scottish court merged with Tudor traditions. The scholar Sujata Iyengar sees The Masque of Blackness performed at Whitehall Palace, as an example of Anne of Denmark's continued use of Scottish theatrical themes in England.

== See also ==
- John Blanke, a musician at the English court
- Entry of Mary, Queen of Scots, into Edinburgh, a pageant involving a "Convoy of Moors".
- Wedding of Mary, Queen of Scots, and Henry, Lord Darnley, pageant actors representing Libyan and Ethiopian Knights.
