= John Mosman =

John Mosman may refer to:

- John Mosman (goldsmith)
- John Mosman (apothecary)
