= More taubronar =

African musician in the Scottish court (d. 1507)

The More Taubronar (died 1507) was a musician of African origin at the court of James IV of Scotland and his wife Margaret Tudor. His name is unknown. A "taubron" was a kind of drum, the word is related to the modern form "tabor". The word "More" or "Moryen" was used for people of African origin at the Scottish court. Archival records credit the More Taubronar as the producer of a costumed dance or masque performed at the Scottish royal court in 1505.

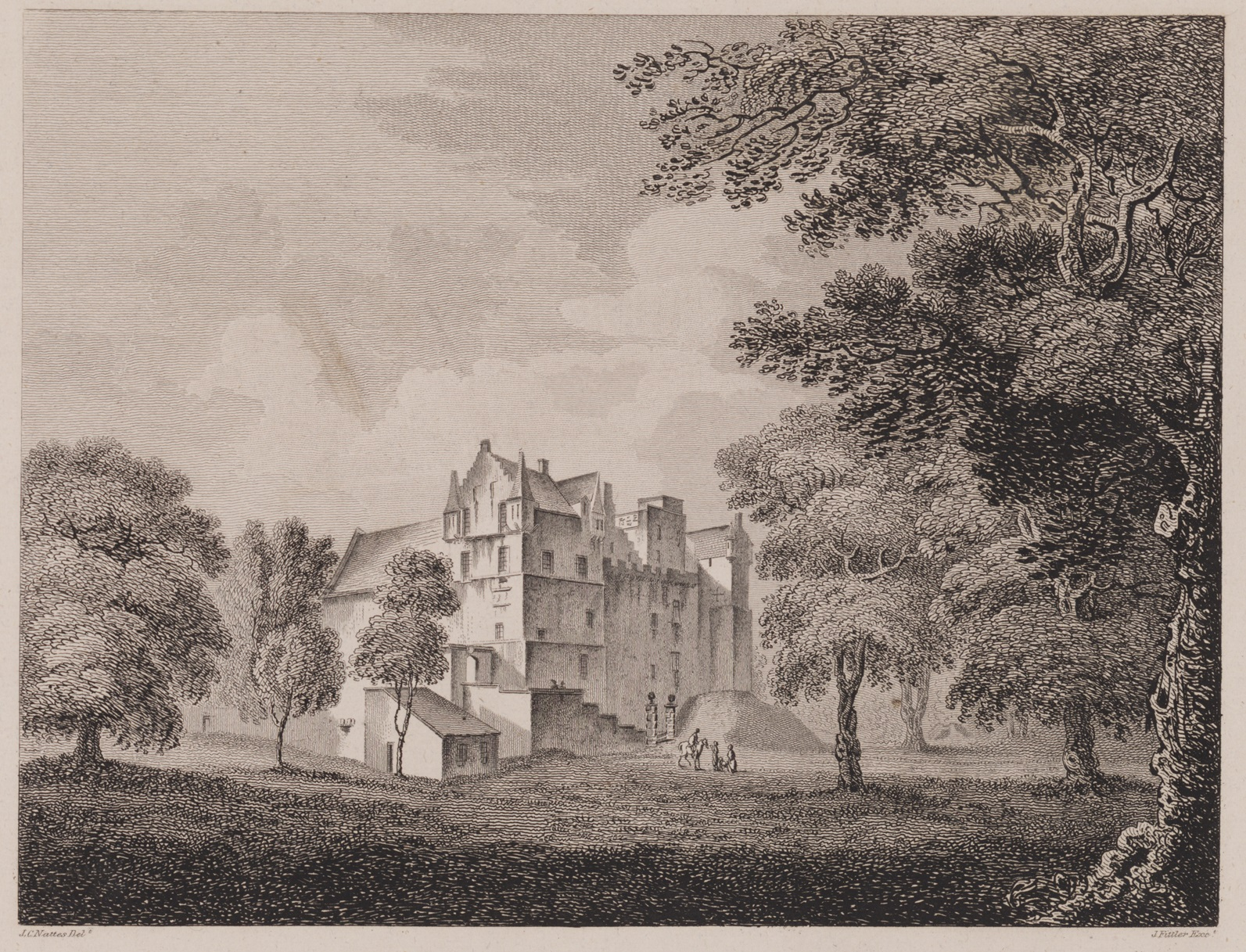
Darnaway Castle where the "More taubronar" performed and the maidens of Forres danced

== An African drummer in the archives ==
Although his name has not been discovered, a few things are known of the drummer's career at the Scottish court through the royal treasurer's accounts. He was first noted in the accounts in December 1504. His fee for three months, a quarter, was £4-7s-6d. Scots. The "More taubronar" appeared at Linlithgow Palace, Stirling Castle and Falkland.

James IV travelled with this drummer and four Italian minstrels to Dumfries, Eskdale and Peebles in September 1504. At Dumfries James IV gave 28 shillings to a musician called "Cloffies" whose "tabroun" drum had been taken by Cuddy Rig, who is identified as a fool and fiddler. "Cloffes" was also bought a coat of kersey at Dumfries. It is not clear if "Cloffies" (perhaps "Clovis") was the king's African drummer. The name does not appear in the royal accounts again, but "Clofois" or "Cloffas" played for the Edinburgh craft of Hammermen in 1502, 1503, and 1505.

The Italian minstrels and the "More taubronar" joined the king on his trip to the north to Brechin, Darnaway and Elgin in October 1504. There were dances, performed by the maidens of Darnaway, Elgin, and Forres. They visited Huntly Castle, then known as "Strathbogie" on their journey back. The king may have paid for the drummer's childcare during this trip to the Mounth, paying his "cheldis expens", alternatively the word 'child' may refer to the drummer's servant. While James was away in the north, Margaret Tudor stayed at Dunfermline Palace with four young African women known as the "More lasses".

In February 1505 the African drummer devised a masque or dance for the tournament held on Shrove-Tide, called "Fasterins Eve". Twelve dancers wore costumes in black and white fabrics, by "the More taubronaris devis".

A coat was made for the "More taubronar" of camlet fabric woven with black and red threads, with a damask doublet in grey and tanny (purplish brown), and begarried (striped) hose in December 1503. In March 1505 he was given 28 shillings to pay for painting his drum, and was paid 14 shillings on 25 March as a reward with other court musicians. This payment was grouped by the accountant with the money given to four Italian "schawmeris", players of the woodwind shawm, presumably the Italian minstrels mentioned in 1504.

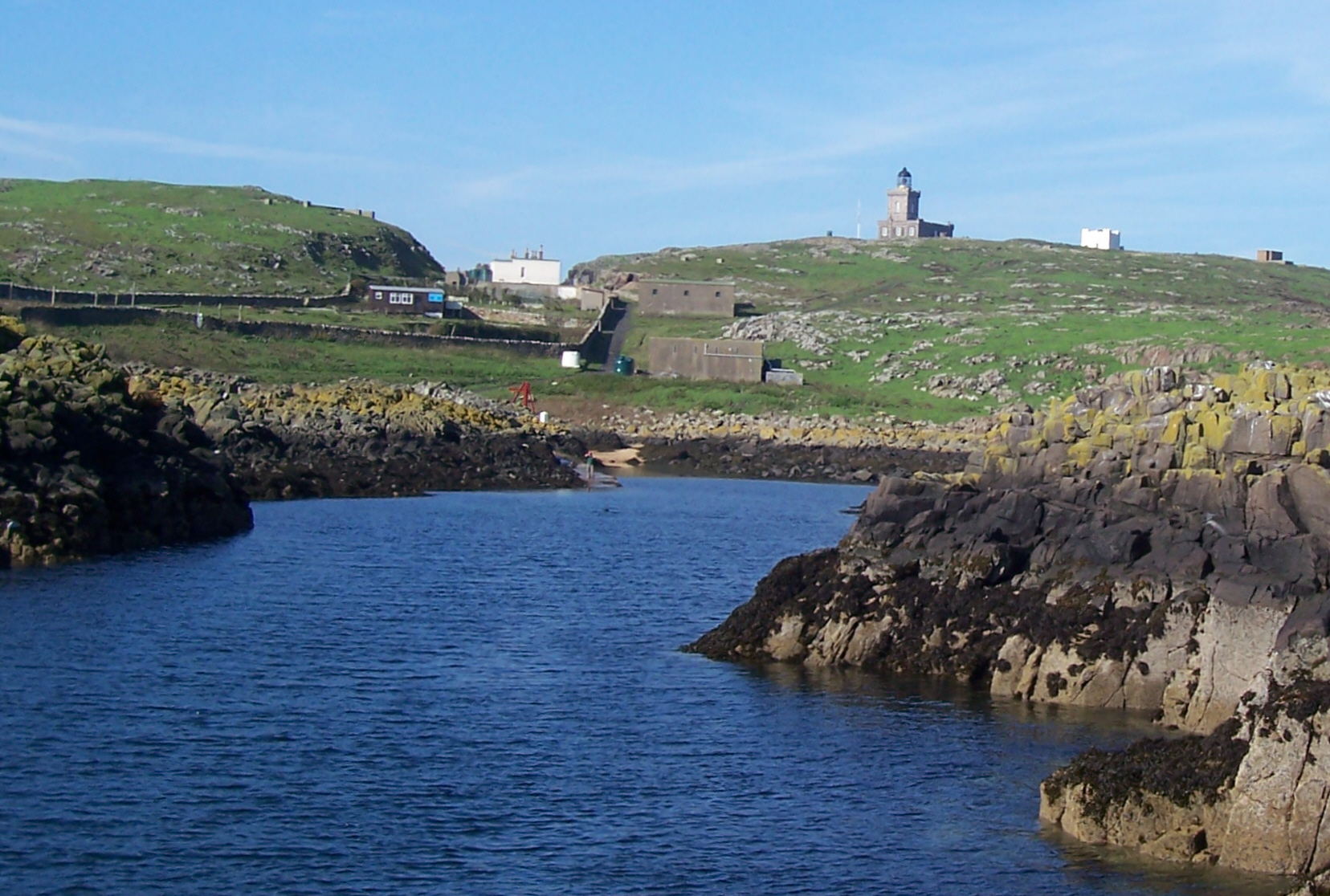
The More taubronar played for James IV on his May pilgrimage to the Isle of May

In December 1505 he was given clothes made from Bruges satin and tanny fabrics, the same costume as the four Italians. Another "taubronar", Ansley, was given a slightly less expensive costume. In May 1506 the "More taubronar" was given a yellow coat lined with taffeta. This was for a special occasion when the king sailed to the Isle of May, a place of pilgrimage in the Firth of Forth.

The "More taubronar" was somehow injured in June 1506 at Holyrood. The king gave his physician 9 shillings in July, and made another payment in August. The accountant called the healer a "leech". In March and May 1507 James IV gave 14 shillings to his wife and child. The Scots word is "barne", perhaps meaning a baby. These payments suggest the African drummer had died.

In February 1506, James IV gave 28 shillings to a nurse that brought the "Moris barne" to him "to see", which may suggest this child, possibly the drummer's, was an object of exotic interest to the king.

Extracts from the treasurer's accounts mentioning the musicians at the court of James IV were first published in the 1830s by Robert Pitcairn and William Dauney. It has sometimes been suggested that another individual recorded in the same sources, "Peter the More", was the same person, although Peter is not mentioned as a musician. In March 1501 "Peter More" was granted a yearly fee of 20 French crowns by privy seal letter. Peter the More was sent to France on royal business in May 1501 and left royal service in August 1504.

== Drummers, dance, and acrobats ==
Records mentioning other drummers at court give context to the role of the More taubronar and his performance activity. In England, Catherine of Aragon had a drummer, a "tabret" player. The "taberers" seem to have played dance music. In January 1494 music for a masque or disguising at Westminster involving 12 male courtiers and 12 ladies was provided by a "small Tabret and a subtyle ffedyll". Henry VIII owned a gold salt cellar which depicted a Morris Dance with five dancers and a "tabrett", or "taberer". An entertainment in London in January 1552 featured "the mores danse [morris dance] dansyng with a tabret".

In Scotland, dancing in Margaret Tudor's chamber was memorialised in a poem by William Dunbar. One of the drummers at the Scottish court, Guilliam, taught the king's daughter Lady Margaret to dance. He produced dances at Holyrood Palace in February 1507, to celebrate the birth of a prince, and in February 1511. Guilliam played for Margaret Tudor aboard the Great Michael or Margaret on 3 August 1512.

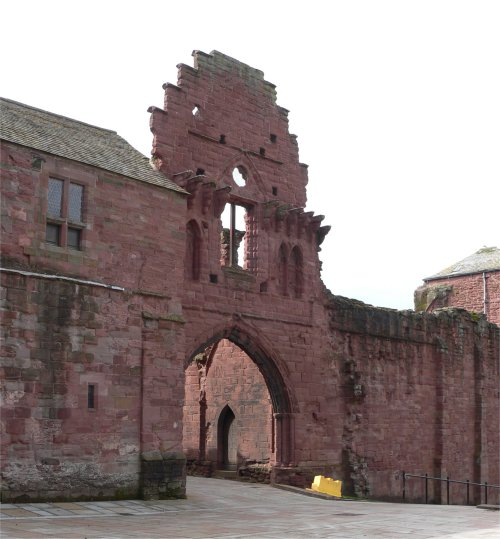
James IV spent New Year 1503 at Arbroath Abbey with entertainment provided by two taubronars

Pringill was given 18 shillings to mend his "tawberne" in May 1489. At Easter 1501, the court musicians were given rewards in cash, the taubronars Adam Boyd, Guilliam, Ansle, and John Portwis or Portuous received 14 shillings. The same drummers, joined by the "taubronar of Leith", received New Year's Day gifts of 28 shillings in January 1502. In January 1503, James IV was at Arbroath Abbey with two taubronars, and was entertained by guisers. Quhynbore the taubronar got a New Year's Day gift in January 1504, and is identified as the taubronar of Leith in another entry. Ansle or Anslie was enough of a favourite, or had sufficient status, to play tennis with the king. The New Year's Day reward given to the More Taubronar in January 1505 was greater than the others, at 28 shillings.

On 6 March 1497, a "tawbronar" played at Stirling Castle with a "spelare". A "spelare" was an acrobat, performing some kind of physical theatre. The accounts mention somersaults and work on the "cord" or tightrope. In March 1497, Ansle the taubronar was given an Easter reward payment, and two "tawbronaris" Guilliame and Pais were given their reward payment jointly with a "spelare". Pais also performed with a fiddler called Bennet.

A group of Italian acrobats was mentioned in July 1502, when James IV gave 42 shillings to Peter de Luca, "the spelaris master". Peter and Francis de Luca, the "spelar boy", had a pension of 20 French crowns. They may have been Italians from Lucca. Francis was given the pension money at Stirling Castle on 22 April 1502 and gave another performance at Stirling on 14 June. He performed at Perth in June 1503 and in August 1503 when Margaret Tudor arrived in Edinburgh. Drummers, "tabretts", played merrily at Margaret Tudor's Royal Entry to Edinburgh, and the "young Italian" acrobat performed on the day after the wedding on the tightrope in the courtyard of Holyrood Palace. An English "spelar" who accompanied Margaret to Scotland and turned somersaults was given 5 crowns when he left in August. The Italians also moved on, one of the acrobats was given 20 crowns when he left the court in April 1502, and another, presumably Francis de Luca, departed with £13 Scots on 24 August 1503.

Acrobats at the English court at this time, entertaining Henry VII, included the tumbers Vonecorps and the Little Maiden, who performed on New Year's Day 1504. Wages for a drummer of African origin, John Blanke, were recorded in the Tudor accounts and he was depicted in the 1511 Westminster Tournament Roll.

== Drummers and mariners ==
On 9 February 1507 James IV visited a shipyard at Dumbarton and was entertained by a taubronar and a fiddler. Some drummers served on, or performed on, one of the king's ships, the "taubronaris of the Jacat". They received a reward for playing when the king sailed between Inchkeith and Kinghorn in May 1502 (perhaps a pilgrimage to the Isle of May, like that involving the More taubronar in May 1506). There was a taubronar on the Barge of Dundee. Some aristocrats employed drummers. Robert Barton, a shipowner who supplied timber for the king's shipbuilding, had a taubronar on his ship in May 1504. The Barton family have been connected (speculatively) with the arrival of African people, including Ellen More, in Scotland.
