= Alexander Elphinstone =

Alexander Elphinstone may refer to:

- Alexander Elphinstone, 1st Lord Elphinstone
- Alexander Elphinstone, 2nd Lord Elphinstone (1510–1547)
- Alexander Elphinstone, 4th Lord Elphinstone (1552–1638)
- Alexander Elphinstone, 19th Lord Elphinstone
- Sir Alexander Elphinstone, de jure 6th Baronet (died 1795), of the Elphinstone baronets
- Sir Alexander Elphinstone, de jure 8th Baronet (1801–1888), of the Elphinstone baronets
- Sir Alexander Logie Elphinstone, 10th Baronet (1880–1970) (claimed title 1927), of the Elphinstone baronets
