= Elizabeth Barlow =

Elizabeth Barlow may refer to:

- Elizabeth Berlay or Barlow (died 1518), English courtier and wife of Lord Elphinstone
- Bess of Hardwick (c. 1527–1608), married name Elizabeth Barlow, influential courtier during the reign of Elizabeth I of England
- Elizabeth Barlow Rogers (born 1936), American landscape designer and author
