= Andrew Aytoun =

Scottish soldier and engineer (died 1547)

Andrew Aytoun (died 1547), was a Scottish soldier and engineer, and captain of Stirling Castle.

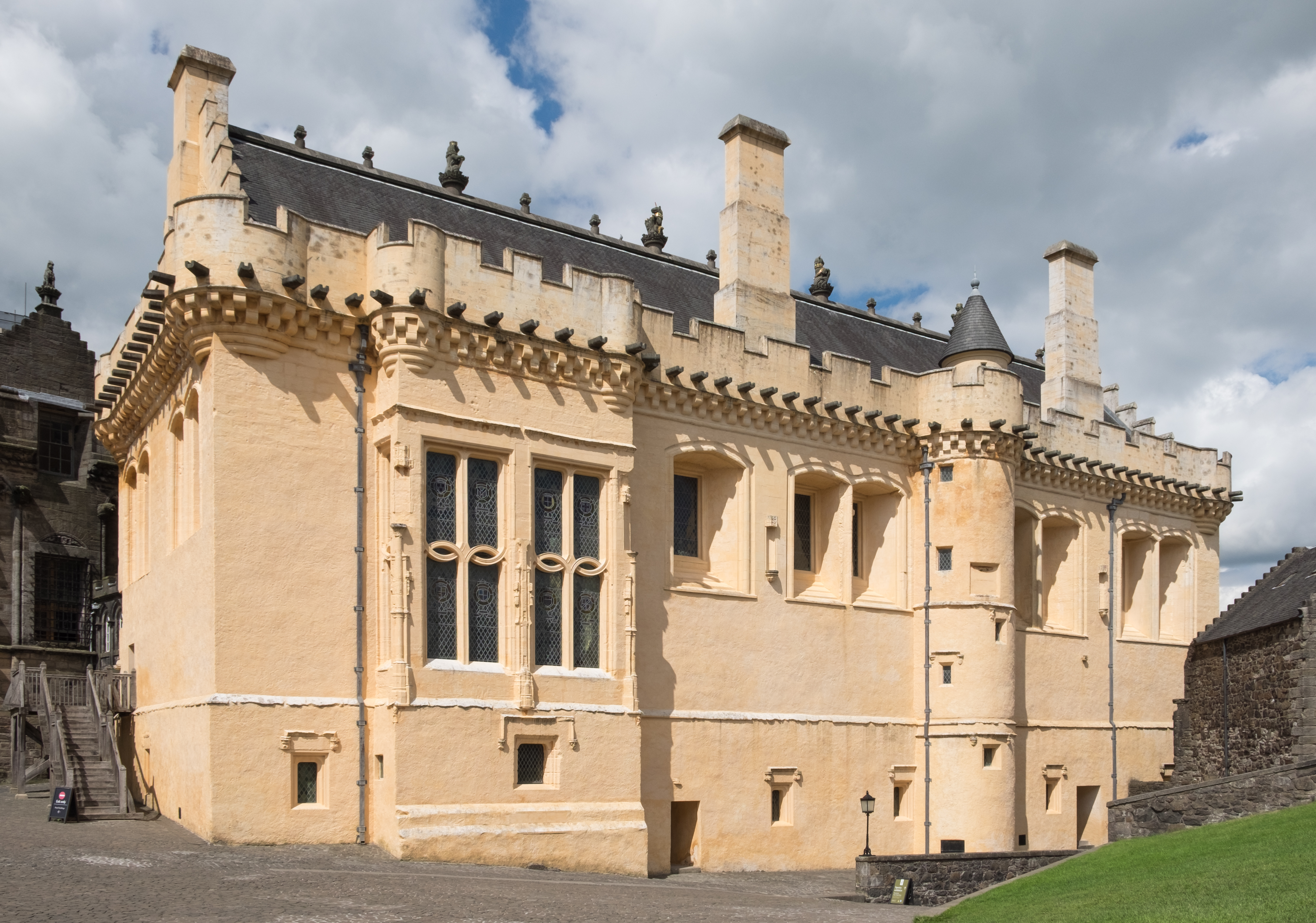
Andrew Aytoun was master of building work at Stirling Castle

Aytoun worked for James IV of Scotland, whose reign lasted from 1488 until his death at the battle of Flodden in 1513. He was regarded as a member of the king's household and bought livery clothes in "Rissilis" black.

== Career ==
He was Chamberlain of the royal estates in Stirlingshire and Strathearn. He was appointed Baillie of Stirlingshire and Keeper of Stirling Castle in February 1501. He was also given a tack of lands at Inveralloun and the West part of Tillicoultry.

From 1497 to 1508 he was master of building work at Stirling Castle, receiving £1,180 Scots in March 1505, and £445 in August 1506 with another £60 for hauling timber in October. The "King's Old Building" at Stirling Castle was completed by Walter Merlioun. The fore-work or gateway was also built at this time, by master masons John Lockhart and John Yorkstone, who managed their own budgets. Lockhart was a valued servant of James IV and had a royal pension of £20 in 1508.

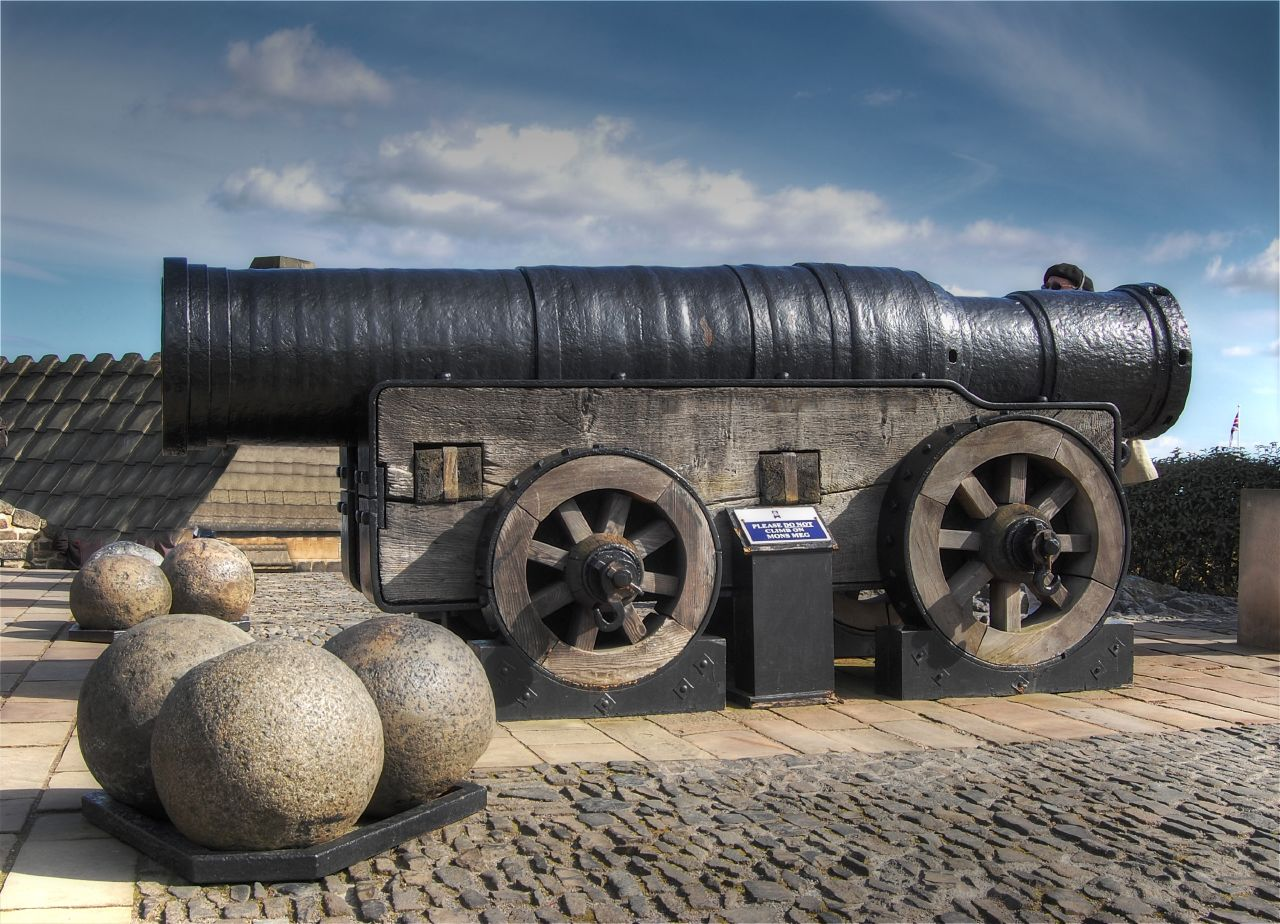
James IV took Mons Meg to bombard Norham Castle in 1497

On 28 July 1497, at "Corriwale Hawch" he delivered a sum of money to Robert Ker, Master of Artillery, who had refurbished the great cannon Mons Meg and was hauling it to Norham Castle. Aytoun may have caught up with Ker and the cannon near "Currie Wood" south of Edinburgh, at Borthwick Castle.

In January 1503 he was paid for the expenses of a royal household in Stirling which included the children of the king and Janet Kennedy, their nurses and female servants. The king had gone on a pilgrimage to Whithorn without these women and children, who were described as the "barnes, nurises and wemen" and were accompanied by the court embroiderers, with Besse Hag and Thomas Fleming. Aytoun also paid for the attendance of a physician, Doctor Ogilvy, and for washing the clothes or swaddling of the youngest children, and the women who rocked their cradles, and the expenses of "the Lady" when Janet Kennedy was in Stirling. When the youngest child died, he paid the nurse her fee and gave her livery clothes.

A similar household group stayed at Stirling again in September 1503, and Margaret Tudor came from Linlithgow Palace. Aytoun obtained a dairy cow, fed the swans, stocked the fish-ponds with trout and pike, and supplied rushes for the floors of the bedchambers. On 20 October 1503 Aytoun helped Margaret Tudor move from Stirling back to Linlithgow. Aytoun paid the expenses of a group of 5 embroiderers including a Fleming, Jacob Stubik, from October 1503 to February 1504.

In July 1505 James IV gave him two shillings for the care of a sick man at the castle.

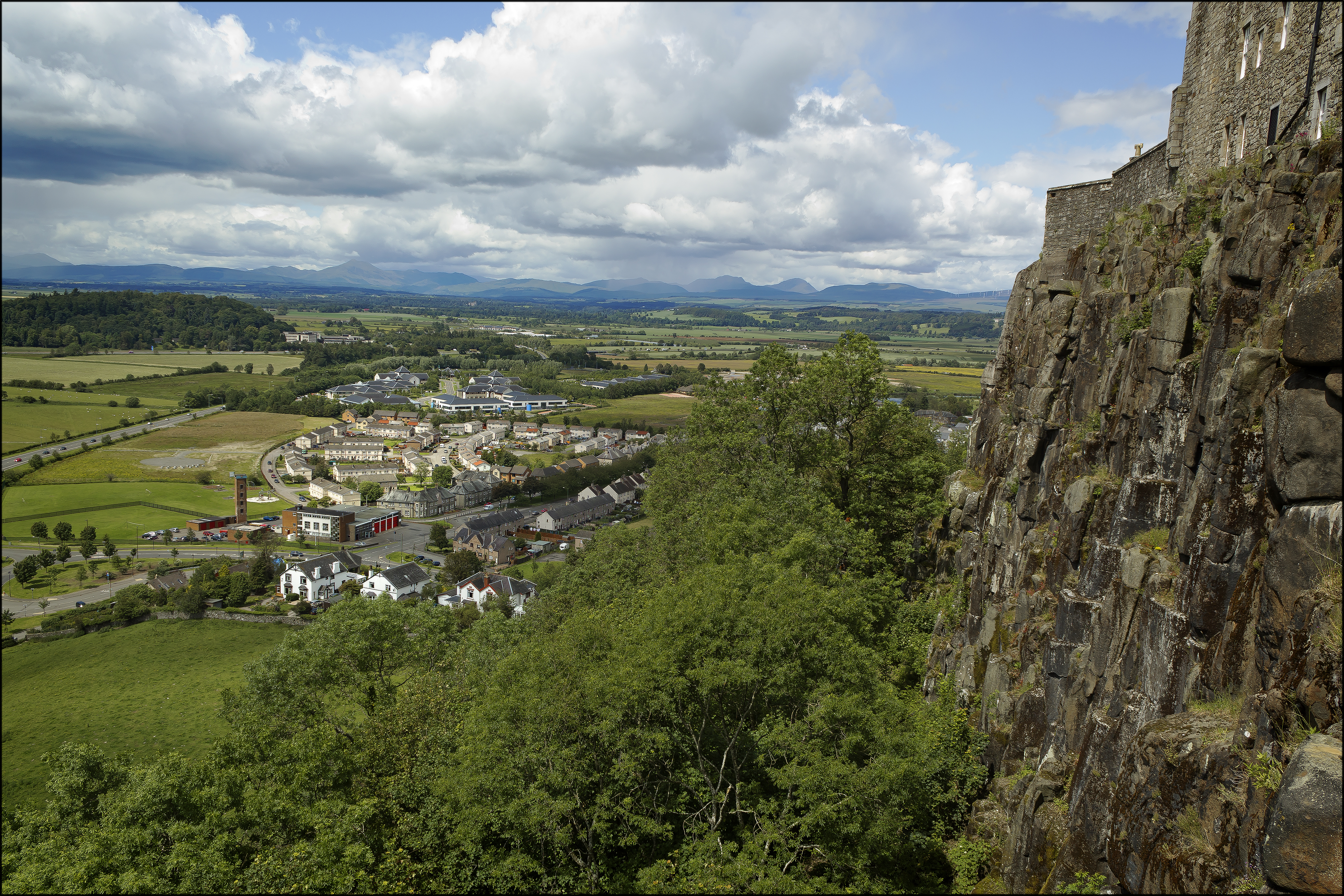
Andrew Aytoun maintained the alchemist Caldwell at Stirling Castle in an effort to create the all-healing fifth element for James IV

In May 1506 he went to Dunblane to buy cart horses, and in June bought taffeta cloth for the king's hat from a Stirling merchant. In August 1506 he paid the king's painter and sent "Irish" prisoners, followers of the Lord of the Isles, from Stirling to Edinburgh.

== Haven of the Pool of Airth ==
In September 1506 Andrew Aytoun was paid for making a dock for ship building at the Pool of Airth on the River Forth. His work was recorded as "casting of the dock in the Poll of Erth to the schip". James IV was a frequent visitor to the dock at Airth, as his one surviving household account book for 1512 shows.

== Alchemy at Stirling Castle ==
In November 1506 Aytoun paid the king's painter again, and also gave money to the alchemist Caldwell who was working in Stirling Castle with a furnace in an effort to make the fifth element known as "quinta essentia". Aytoun provided coal and charcoal for the alchemist's furnace in February, April, and May 1507. Aytoun had supplied earthenware pots, alum, salt, and eggs to Alexander Ogilvy for the project in September 1503. The apothecary John Mosman also contributed to the alchemical work. The remains of a floor with heat-cracked tiles discovered at the castle by archaeologists at the "Ladies' Lookout" is believed to be the site of the workshop Aytoun provided for Caldwell, or perhaps represents a kitchen. The burnt area is discussed as an "oven".

== Later life ==
In August 1507 Aytoun was the keeper of Donald of the Isles at Stirling Castle, and spent £17 on his prisoner's clothes.

James IV gave him the lands of Nether Dunmure, or Denmuir, in the parish of Dunbog in Fife in 1507 for his good service.

In January 1508 James IV gave his offices of keeper of Stirling Castle and Baillie of Stirlingshire to Alexander Elphinstone and his English wife, Elizabeth Barlay.

Andrew Aytoun died in September 1547.

== Marriage and family ==
Andrew Ayton married Isobel Kencragie. Their children included:

- John Aytoun
- Robert Aytoun of Inchdairnie
- Andrew Aytoun of Kinaldie, who married Mary Lundie, their son was the poet Robert Aytoun.
