= William Foular =

Scottish apothecary

William Foular was a Scottish apothecary who served the Scottish court.

== Career ==
Foular supplied medicines and cures to King James IV and his wife Margaret Tudor. Payments were recorded in the royal treasurer's accounts. A copy of a household roll of the Scottish court made around 1507 names him and John Mosman as the court "pottingaris". "Pottingar" is an old Scots language word for apothecary.

Foular was based in Edinburgh, and a burgess of the town. He seems to have sold books, missals, and offertory candles to the king, although similar books were also provided by a man called by "John Foular".

From January 1500 Foular had a royal pension of 20 merks paid from the customs of Edinburgh, and was exempted from the burdens of civic duties.

He was paid in December 1507 for the "distillation of waters" and aqua vitae for the King and Queen over the year, and for English apothecary books supplied to the royal household.

Foular supplied "glasses" which were perhaps urinals for diagnosis. James IV was an enthusiastic alchemist and maintained furnaces at Stirling Castle and Holyrood Palace in an attempt to make the fifth element, the "quinta essentia". Foular sourced materials for the project, including five pounds of quicksilver or mercury.

In January 1503 he was paid £34 Scots for a year's supplies, and in June 1504 just over £37 for apothecary goods supplied to James IV over four months.

In July 1504 Foular sent medicinal spices including pepper, cinnamon, "cubebarum", and "galiga", with glass urinals, to Margaret Tudor at Stirling Castle. The order was for a recipe provided by Master Robert Schaw. Schaw appears to have been a physician serving the women of the court, and was mentioned in William Dunbar's poem Of a Dance in the Quenis Chamber.

Margaret Tudor suffered from nosebleeds, and Foular provided a blood stone or heliotrope as a remedy in February 1505 with "other stuff for bleeding of the nose". At the same time he sent medicines according to a recipe provided by Master William Baillie, and sent fine green ginger and citron comfits to the queen.

He may have supplied blue azurite in three grades to the king's painter working at Stirling in July 1506. Foular also provided materials to another court apothecary, John Mosman. The last payment recorded to Foular was in December 1512 for a year's supply of "powder, spicery, apothecary, and materials for the King and Queen".

In the 1590s the Scottish court was served by the apothecary Alexander Barclay.
