= Wild Knight and the Black Lady =

1507 and 1508 events in Edinburgh, Scotland

The tournament of the Wild Knight and the Black Lady was an event held twice in Edinburgh by James IV of Scotland, in June 1507 and May 1508.

== Themes ==
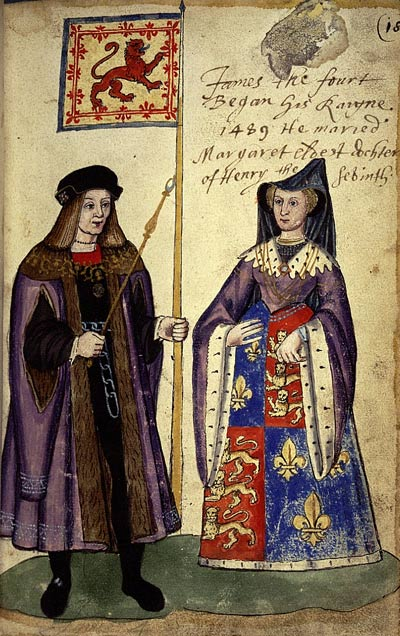
James IV of Scotland and Margaret Tudor

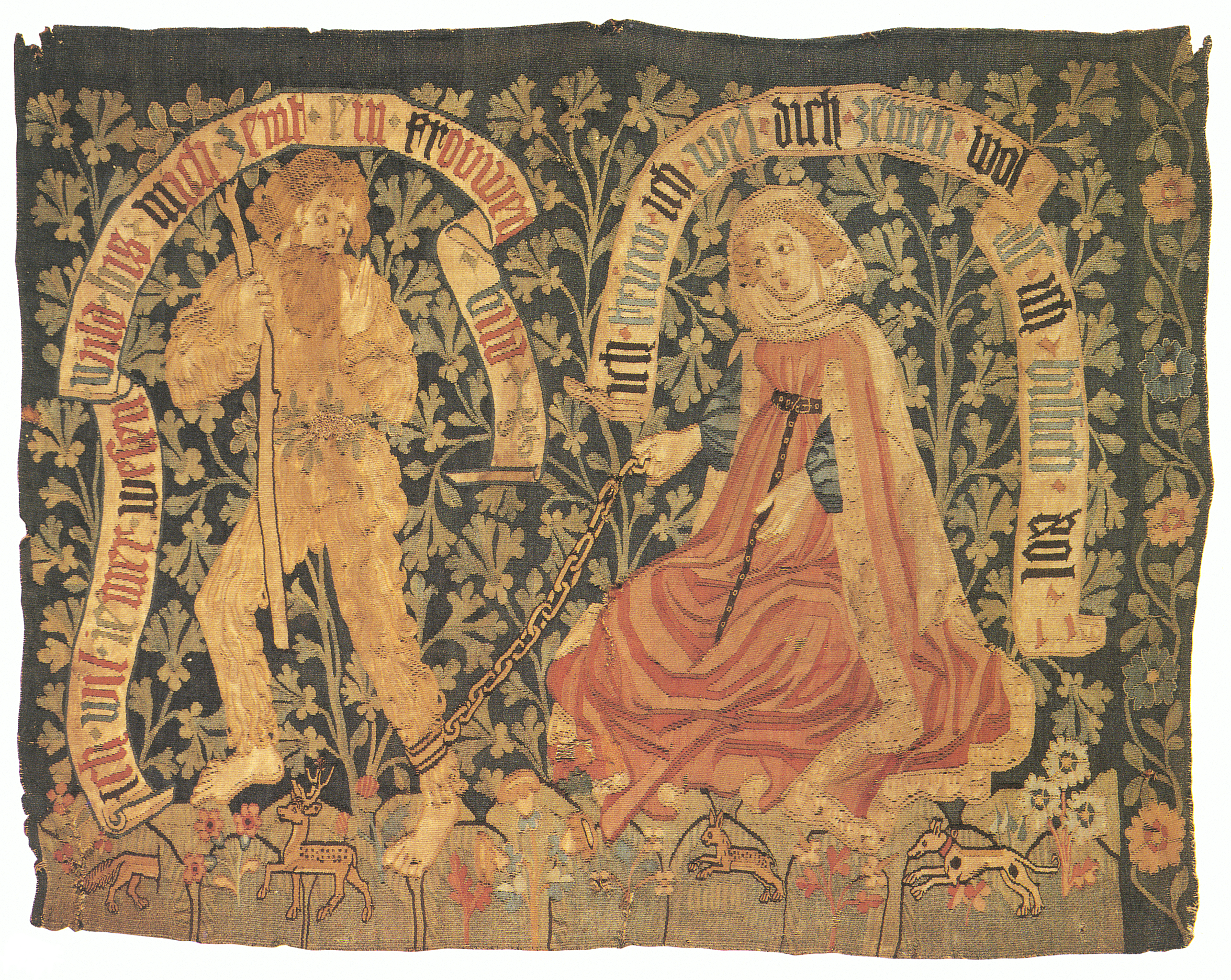
Tapestry of a wild man held captive by a lady, c. 1500

The invitation outlining the articles of the tournament to be sent to France was illuminated with gold leaf in February 1507. The priest John Ramsay wrote out the words and Thomas Galbraith of the Chapel Royal may have been the illuminator. The document itself does not survive, but some of the text was preserved, and is available in a recent (2025) translation.

Bluemantle or Rothesay Herald, sent abroad in March 1507 to announce the birth of James, Duke of Rothesay, may have carried the invitation to the courts of France, Spain, and Portugal. The articles were issued by the Marchmont Herald on behalf of the Chevalier Sauvage à la Dame Noire, the Wild Knight to the Black Lady, and gave details of the events to be held at Edinburgh, According to the challenge or "emprise", these "feats of arms will take place in this kingdom, in the town of Edinburgh on the Field of Memory which will be situated between the castle known as that of the Maidens and the Secret Pavilion, and in this Field will be the Tree of Esperance, which grows in the Garden of Patience and bears leaves of Pleasure, flowers of Nobility and fruits of Honour", featuring (for the second event in 1508) Antoine d'Arces, seigneur de La Bastie as the White Knight.

Painters were supplied with glue, chalk, pots called "piggis", silver leaf, varnish, verdigris, and linseed oil for painting the props and heraldic decorations. Thomas Galbraith and Piers the Painter gilded highlights and heraldry on banners, tents, and tabards for the heralds and minstrels. Artificial leaves, flowers, and fruit including pears were made for the Tree of Esperance.

Alexander Chalmer made and painted heraldic "beast heads" which decorated the field below Edinburgh Castle named for the event as the Chateau des Pucelles. The earlier chivalric romance Perceforest describes a tournament at this "Castle of Maidens", the Chastel aux Pucelles.

The king's weapons were made by Alan Cochran, the cutler William Rae, and French armourers and smiths working for the Scottish court. John Mayne and others made spears or lances.

== Locations ==
The pageantry started at Edinburgh Castle. The location of the tournament ground was near the present day Grassmarket and West Port. A charter made in 1567 for property around the King's Stables mentions the "Barras" or "Barrowis", the chapel at the "barras" or lists, and the "hastiludium", a Latinate word for lance sports. The concluding banquet was at Holyrood Palace.

== Performance ==
James IV took part in the character of the Wild Knight. Possibly, the character represented the Scottish Highlands. The Black Lady was a courtier, possibly Ellen More or Elizabeth Berlay. A contemporary racist poem by William Dunbar, Of Ane Blak-Moir, describes a woman of African origin, lately arrived in Scotland on a ship, who presided at a tournament.

The Black Lady was carried in a triumphal chair from Edinburgh Castle to the tournament ground, escorted by Alexander Elphinstone (who subsequently married Elizabeth Berlay) and others. "Wild men" at the jousting course or barriers were dressed in goat skin costumes made by James Aikman and wore hart horns from Tullibardine. There was a cannon salute, supervised by Hans the Gunner.

On the first day of the events, challengers were to assemble at the "Tree of Esperance" at the tournament ground beneath Edinburgh castle, where the Black Lady kept the week's white shield, accompanied by the wild men. The tree of Esperance or Hope was decorated with artificial flowers, pears, wooden apples, and painted heraldic shields, moulded in leather by Simon Glasford, a buckler-maker.

Trumpeters and shawmers punctuated the events. Combats and jousts were scored by judges and the ladies, women of Margaret Tudor's household and the court. The competition and combats were said to "counterfeit the round table of King Arthur". According to Robert Lindsay of Pitscottie, prizes included gold and silver gilt weapons as trophies. One of the king's gold chains was given to a goldsmith Matthew Auchinleck for gilding "prizes for the field".

Events concluded with three days of banqueting at Holyroodhouse. There was a masque and a dance organised by Lady Musgrave, Mistress of the Queen's Wardrobe. The Black Lady came into the hall with Martin the Spaniard who was equipped with an archery bow and dressed in yellow. A cloud descended from the roof and swept them both away.

== Occasions ==
The 1507 event may have been a celebration of the birth of a son to James IV and Margaret Tudor. The 1508 event seems to be linked to a visit of Bernard Stewart, 3rd Lord of Aubigny, who judged some events. The royal treasurer's accounts include updates to equipment and costume. In 1508 the Black Lady's costume was renewed with a green woollen skirt, and new black leather sleeves and gloves. Her two maidens wore Bruges satin.

Various payments in the treasurer's accounts, written in the Scots language, can be connected with the tournament and performances. In May 1508, the men who carried the Black Lady in her pageant car were paid two shillings each:

Item, the last day of Maij, to the xiiij (14) men that bure the blak lady fra the Castell to the barres and syne to the Abbay – xxviij (28) s.

The 1508 accounts include "dancing coats", possibly for a performance similar to a Morris Dance at the banquet, and a later writer Robert Lindsay of Pitscottie described speeches and presentations between courses. One 1508 payment seems to be a reference to the leatherworkers who made harnesses for the theatrical disappearance of Martin and the Black Lady at the Holyrood banquet:

Item, for bukkilling and grathing of Martin and the Blak lady agane the bancat –xiiij (14) s.

== Recueil d'Arras ==
An album of portrait sketches, made later in the 16th century, is known as the Recueil d'Arras. The album includes a portrait of Antoine d'Arces, Sieur de la Bastie, and a French inscription which describes his attendance at the tournament with three companions.

Messire Anthoyne Darses, Sr de la Bastie en Daulphyne, appellé le Chevallier Blancq, vint en Escoce accompaignie de trois sieurs, assavoir Monsieur de Sainct Maurice, Jean Joffroy Sr de Dompierre, et Guillaume Dorbecke, pour faire joustes à fer mollu et tranchant. Ledict Joffroy Sr de Dompierre fut tué en ladicte jouste.

(translation) De la Bastie, called "The White Knight", went to Scotland accompanied by three knights or squires, that is the Master of Saint Maurice, Jean Joffroy sieur de Dompierre, and Guillaume Dorbecke, to joust both with blunted and sharp points. The said Joffroy was killed in the said tourney.
