= Elizabeth Berlay =

English lady in waiting

Elizabeth Barlay or Barlow (died 1518) was an English lady in waiting to Margaret Tudor the wife of James IV of Scotland.

== Background ==
Details of her English family are obscure. She may have been a daughter of John Barlow and Christian Berlay, or their relative. An 18th-century genealogical manuscript claimed that she was a sister of the bishop William Barlow and the explorer Roger Barlow. Some members of the Barlow family were involved in the rebellion of Perkin Warbeck. Despite this, she found a place at court and joined the household of Margaret Tudor in England in March 1503. The Barlow genealogical manuscript says this was due to the patronage of Margaret Neville, Countess of Oxford.

== At court in England and Scotland ==
In England, as a member of the Queen of Scots' retinue, she was given chamlet silk for a gown. In June 1503 she was given a gown of tawny chamlet edged with black velvet, and a kirtle of black wool worsted lined with linen and wool cloth, and linen for smocks and headdresses. "Mistress Zouche" and the chamberer (bedchamber servant) Frances Baptiste received similar clothing. During the journey north, Elizabeth Zouche married Gerald FitzGerald, 9th Earl of Kildare at Collyweston, and her sister Elianora Zouche married John Melton, and neither came to Scotland with Margaret Tudor.

The Scottish royal accounts for 1503, 1505 and 1506 include her fee of 50 English shillings for six months. She injured her arm in August 1505 and was attended by the royal apothecary, John Mossman. In February 1505 the king gave her velvet for a gown, and satin for a summer gown in July 1506. As a New Year's Day gift in 1507 she was given a pair of rosary beads of gold with a cross costing £62 Scots.

== Lady Elphinstone ==
She married Alexander Elphinstone, 1st Lord Elphinstone in August 1507. A charter from James IV of Innernochty and other lands mentions that she was resolved to stay in Scotland all the days of her life.

In August 1507 Margaret Tudor gave her a velvet and satin gown, a featherbed, bedclothes, and a "verdure" bedcover, probably as a marriage gift

Alexander Elphinstone played a "Squire of the Black Lady" at the royal tournament in Edinburgh in 1507. The role was to escort the "Black Lady", possibly played by Ellen More or Elizabeth Berlay, in her triumphal chair from Edinburgh Castle to the tournament ground. Elphinstone and his companion William Ogilvy were dressed in outfits of white damask.

Elphinstone and Elizabeth Berlay were made keepers of Stirling Castle in succession to Andrew Aytoun in January 1508. James IV also made them keepers of Kildrummy Castle. In 1508 they transferred their rights over lands at the Wester town of Tillicoultry known as Colinstoun to James Schaw of Sauchie and his wife Alison Home. In 1513 Kildrummy was regranted to the couple and united with Innernochty into the Lordship of Elphinstone.

Her two maidens, her attendants, were given 5 French gold crowns each in January 1512, the same gift was given to an African servant of the queen, Ellen More.

Lord Elphinstone was killed at the Battle of Flodden in September 1513, along with many other Scottish noblemen, and was succeeded in the lordship by their son Alexander.

== Later life ==
She later married John Forbes, 6th Lord Forbes.

Elizabeth Berlay died in September 1518.

== Marriages and children ==
The children of Lord Elphinstone and Elizabeth Barlow included:

- Alexander Elphinstone, 2nd Lord Elphinstone
- Euphemia Elphinstone, who was a mistress of King James V of Scotland and mother of Robert Stewart, 1st Earl of Orkney. She married John Bruce of Cultmalindie. Her son Laurence Bruce was the builder of Muness Castle on Unst.

According to the genealogy of the Forbes family by Matthew Lumsden, she was the mother of:

- Arthur Forbes of Putachie, called Black Arthur, who was killed at the battle of Tillieangus in 1571
- Jean Forbes (1516-1542), who married (1) John Stewart, 3rd Earl of Atholl, (2) Alexander Hay of Delgatie, (3) William Leslie of Balquhain
