= John Blanke =

London trumpeter, fl. 1501–1511

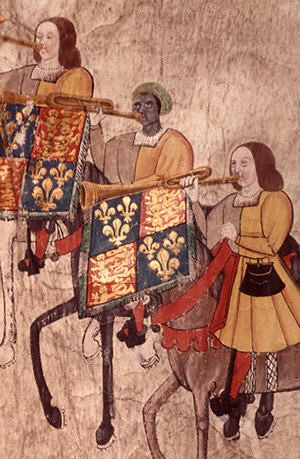
Extract from the 1511 Westminster Tournament Roll almost certainly showing Blanke, wearing a green turban latticed with yellow

John Blanke (also rendered Blancke or Blaaak) (fl. 1501–1511) was a musician of African descent in London from the early Tudor period, who probably came to England as one of the African attendants of Catherine of Aragon in 1501. He is one of the earliest documented Africans in what is now the United Kingdom after the Roman period. His name may refer to his skin colour, derived either from the word "black" or possibly from the French word "blanc", meaning white.

== Life ==
Little is known about his life, but he was paid 8 pence per day by King Henry VII. A surviving document from the accounts of the Treasurer of the Chamber records a payment of 20 shillings to "John Blanke the Blacke Trumpet" for wages on December 1507, with payments of the same amount continuing monthly through the next year. His annual wage of £12 was twice that of a farm labourer and thrice that of a servant. He successfully petitioned Henry VIII for a wage increase from 8d. to 16d.

Another trumpeter, thought to be of African origin, Alfonso or Alonso de Valdenebro, known as Alonso "el Negro" in Spanish records, came to England in the retinue of Catherine of Aragon in 1501. John Blanke attended both the funeral of King Henry VII and the coronation of Henry VIII in 1509, and is thought to have married in 1512.

Sydney Anglo was the first historian to propose that the "Blanke Trumpet" in the 1507 court accounts was the same as the black man depicted twice in the 1511 Westminster Tournament Roll, in a footnote to an article about the Court Festivals of Henry VII. The Westminster Tournament Roll is an illuminated, 60-foot manuscript now held by the College of Arms; it recorded the royal procession to the lavish tournament held on 12 and 13 February 1511 to celebrate the birth of a son, Henry, Duke of Cornwall (died 23 February 1511), to Catherine and Henry VIII on New Year's Day 1511. John Blanke is depicted twice, as one of the six trumpeters on horseback in the royal retinue. All six of the trumpeters wear yellow and grey livery and bear a trumpet decorated with the royal arms; Blanke alone wears a brown and yellow turban, while the others are bare-headed with longish hair. He appears a second time in the roll, wearing a green and gold head covering.

Black trumpeters and drummers are known to have been employed at European state occasions from at least the 12th century: the earliest reference is to the turbaned black trumpeters who heralded the entry of Henry VI, Holy Roman Emperor into Palermo, Sicily in 1194. By the Renaissance, there are references to their presence in several cities, including a trumpeter for the royal ship Barcha in Naples in 1470, a trumpeter recorded as galley slave of Cosimo I de' Medici, Grand Duke of Tuscany in 1555, and black drummers in the court of King James IV in Edinburgh, Scotland.

== Commemoration ==
In 2020, Blanke was listed as one of 100 Great Black Britons who have helped to shape Britain, featured in a book of the same name by Patrick Vernon.

British rapper and novelist Akala based a character in his book The Dark Lady on John Blanke, released in 2021.

In January 2022, a Nubian Jak Community Trust blue plaque was installed in Blanke's honour at King Charles Court, home to Trinity Laban Conservatoire of Music and Dance's Faculty of Music at the Old Royal Naval College in Greenwich, London.

In May 2022, an exhibition titled The Tudors: Passion, Power and Politics at the Walker Art Gallery in Liverpool displayed in public for the first time in 20 years two portraits of Blanke on the Westminster Tournament Roll. It was the first time the document was shown outside London.

The John Blanke Project is an art and archive initiative of which Michael Ohajuru is the founder and director. The Project celebrates and is linked to images of Blanke, and was featured in a Sky Arts presentation on 11 July 2023, marking the opening of the refurbished National Portrait Gallery, London. The book Who is John Blanke? Artists and Historians Reimagine the Black Tudor Trumpeter, edited by Ohajuru and including the images and words of more than 100 artists and historians, was published in April 2025.

== See also ==
- African presence at the Scottish royal court
- More taubronar, a musician at the Scottish royal court
- Catalina of Motril
