= Of Ane Blak-Moir =

Poem by William Dunbar

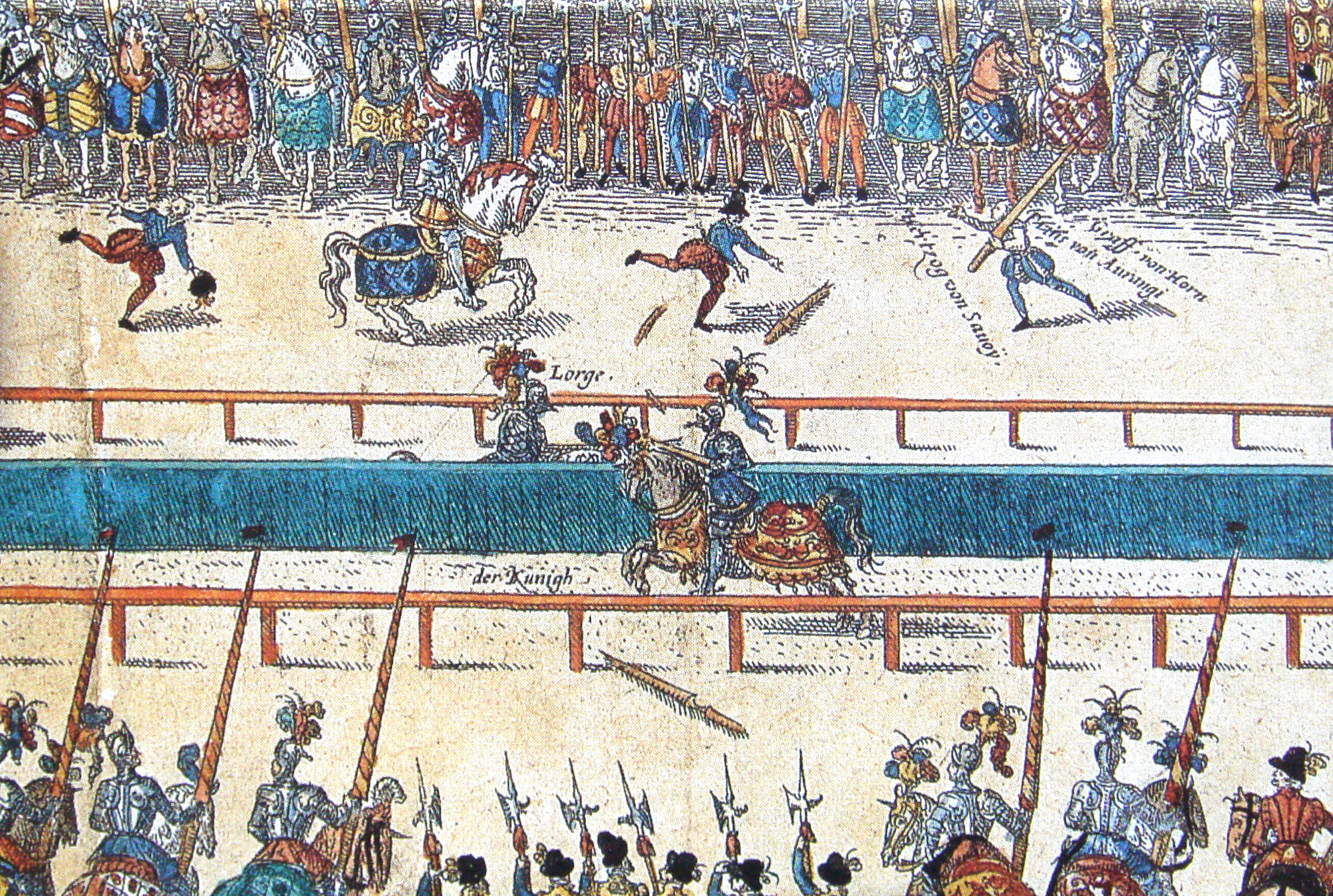
A tournament of the 16th century. The print depicts the joust of 1559 in which Henri II of France was fatally wounded.

"Of Ane Blak-Moir" is a short poem in Scots by William Dunbar (born 1459 or 1460).

It takes the form of a hymn in praise of a beautiful lady, but is a parody of the form. The lady addressed is apparently an African woman playing a role in a tournament or chivalric pageant. It is one of the first references to someone of Sub-Saharan African origin living in Scotland, who had recently arrived by ship. The "portrayal of the black woman creates a very unfavourable contrast between black female physiology and that of white ladies at court", and compares her to animals.

The text of the poem is preserved in the Maitland Folio Manuscript.

== The Poem ==
"Of Ane Blak-Moir" is written in five short and simple stanzas. The tone is one of scurrilous comedy. In the first two stanzas, the poet describes his subject's unfamiliar complexion and features in impolite terms.

Lang heff I maed of ladyes quhytt,
Nou of an blak I will indytt,
That landet furth of the last schippis,
Quhou fain wald I descryve perfytt,
My ladye with the mekle lippis.

Quhou schou is tute mowitt lyk an aep,
And lyk a gangarall onto gaep,
And quhou hir schort catt nois up skippis,
And quhou schou schynes lyk ony saep,
My ladye with the mekle lippis.

The description is continued. A punning reference to The nycht/The Knycht desiring to be her champion is made.

Quhen schou is claid in reche apparrall,
Schou blinkis als brycht as an tar barrell
Quhen schou was born the son tholit clippis,
The nycht be fain faucht in hir querrell,
My ladye with the mekle lippis.

The fourth stanza relates how "My ladye with the mekle lippis" is the object of other knights' attention. The man who "for her sake with spear and shield proves most mightily in the field", shall win the lady.

Quhai for hir saek with speir and scheld
Preiffis maest mychtellye in the feld,
Sall kis and withe hir go in grippis,
And fra thyne furth hir luff sall weld,
My ladye with the mekle lippis.

The final stanza tells of the fate of those "who in the field receives shame".

And quhai in felde receaves schaem,
And tynis thair his knychtlie naem,
Sall cum behind and kis hir hippis,
And nevir to uther confort claem,
My ladye with the mekle lippis.

== Interpretation ==
William Dunbar was a poet employed at the court of King James IV from 1500 to at least 1513. He often composed poetry which marked courtly events.

The reign of James IV (1488 to 1513) coincided with the era of Portuguese exploration which established firm contact between Europe and Africa. James licensed Scottish privateers like Andrew Barton to attack Portuguese shipping. This may have provided a potential route for African people to reach Scotland. The accounts of the Treasurer of Scotland record the employment of some Africans at James's court. These people were referred to variously as "Ethiopians", "mores", or "blak ladeis". Some of these women were employed in Edinburgh Castle in the household of Lady Margaret, the daughter of the King and Margaret Drummond. One woman's name was recorded as "Ellen More", and she was later an attendant of Margaret Tudor at Linlithgow Palace.

The King staged elaborate tournaments which included scripted spectacle as much as genuine sporting competition. Given the poem's tournament context where a "blak" woman is the centre of attention of the jousting knights it may be speculated that the subject of the poem was a character in one of these pageants. The poem seems to be associated with a recorded tournament called "The justing of the wyld knicht for the blak lady" held in June 1507 and again in May 1508. The part of the "Black Lady" was played by a woman of the court, perhaps Ellen More. The lavish expenditure on these events was recorded in the Lord High Treasurer's accounts.

The invitation to the tournament sent to France was illuminated with gold leaf. It was issued by the Marchmont Herald on behalf of the 'Chevalier Sauvage à la Dame Noire', the Wild Knight to the Black Lady, and gave details of the events to be held at Edinburgh. The Black Lady's gown was made from Flanders damask figured with flowers, bordered with yellow and green taffeta, with outer sleeves of black gauze, and inner sleeves and gloves of black leather, and she wore a drape of the same black gauze about her shoulders and arms. In 1508 the costume was renewed with a green woollen skirt, and new leather sleeves and gloves. William Ogilvy and Alexander Elphinstone dressed in white damask as the "Squires of the Black Lady" and escorted her from Edinburgh Castle to the field of the tournament. Antoine d'Arces was the "White Knight". James IV himself played the part of the Wild or Savage Knight.
