= Round Table (tournament) =

A Round Table was a festive event during the Middle Ages that involved jousting, feasting, and dancing in imitation of King Arthur's legendary court. Named for Arthur's famed Round Table, the festivals generally involved jousts with blunted weapons, and often celebrated weddings or victories. In some cases participants dressed in the costume of such well-known knights as Lancelot, Tristan, and Palamedes.

== History ==
The earliest Round Table was recorded in 1223, when the Crusader lord of Beirut held one in Cyprus to celebrate the knighting of his eldest sons. Round Tables were popular in various European countries through the rest of the Middle Ages and were at times very elaborate.

=== Round Tables in England ===
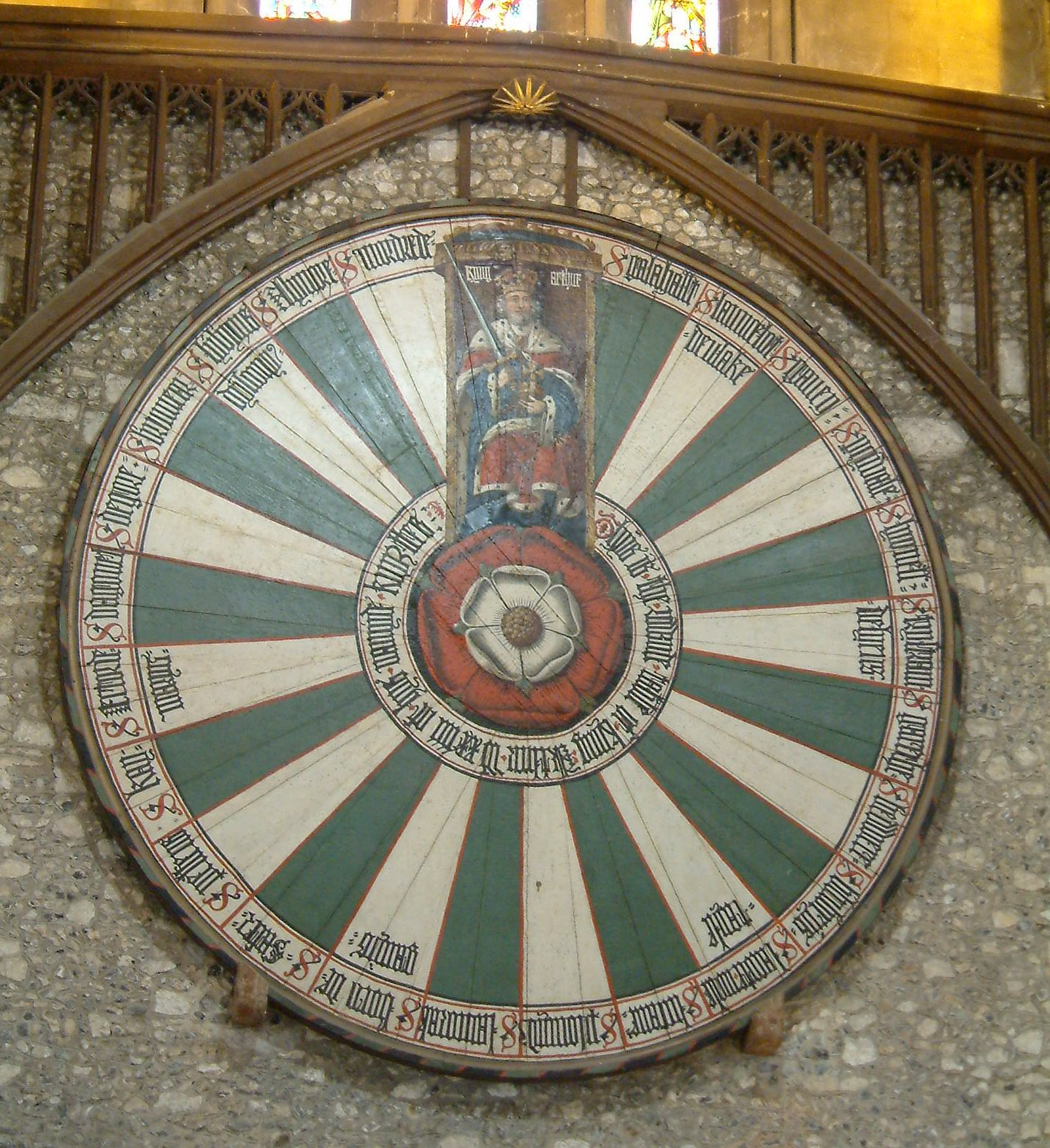
The "Winchester Round Table"

Edward I held one on the occasion of his marriage, and one in 1284 to celebrate his conquest of Wales; and is recorded as sponsoring several as late as 1304. One artefact that has survived from this fashion in England is the "Winchester Round Table" in the Great Hall at Winchester Castle. The timber of this table has been dated by dendrochronology to 1275, during Edward's reign, though a royal provenance is not proven so far. The present "Winchester Round Table" was painted in 1522 by order of King Henry VIII. The places at the table are divided up with alternating green and white panels with the name of Arthurian knights written in gold. However it is King Henry VIII's portrait that is painted at King Arthur's place, and the Tudor red and white rose that adorns the table's centre.

Edward III held a tournament and feast at Windsor in 1344 and built a huge round structure to house it. The details of its use are obscure. However, it is believed that he intended to found an order of knighthood named after the Round Table and modelled on the fellowship of King Arthur; in the event, in 1348, the order he established was named after the Garter.

=== Round Tables elsewhere in Europe ===
Round Tables were an aristocratic activity throughout Europe from the 13th until the 15th centuries, being recorded in France from 1235 to 1332. In Aragon they were held as early as 1269 in Valencia and as late as 1291 in Catalonia. According to Roger Sherman Loomis, "Popes and prelates thundered against these costly, dangerous, and sometimes licentious frivolities, and denied Christian burial to those who took part." Even the middle classes were caught up in this spectacle.

In 1281, a burgher of Magdeburg announced a Round Table in that town. Another was set up by the burghers of Tournai in 1330. René of Anjou, the King of Naples, even erected an Arthurian castle for his 1446 Round Table.

In 1507 and 1508 James IV of Scotland held a tournament of the Wild Knight and the Black Lady at Edinburgh that was said to "counterfeit the round table of King Arthur". In 1566, Mary, Queen of Scots gave a feast in Stirling Castle with 30 guests at an imagined replica of Arthur's table during the masque-themed celebrations of the baptism of the future James VI.
