= John Mosman (apothecary) =

John Mosman was an apothecary at the Scottish court.

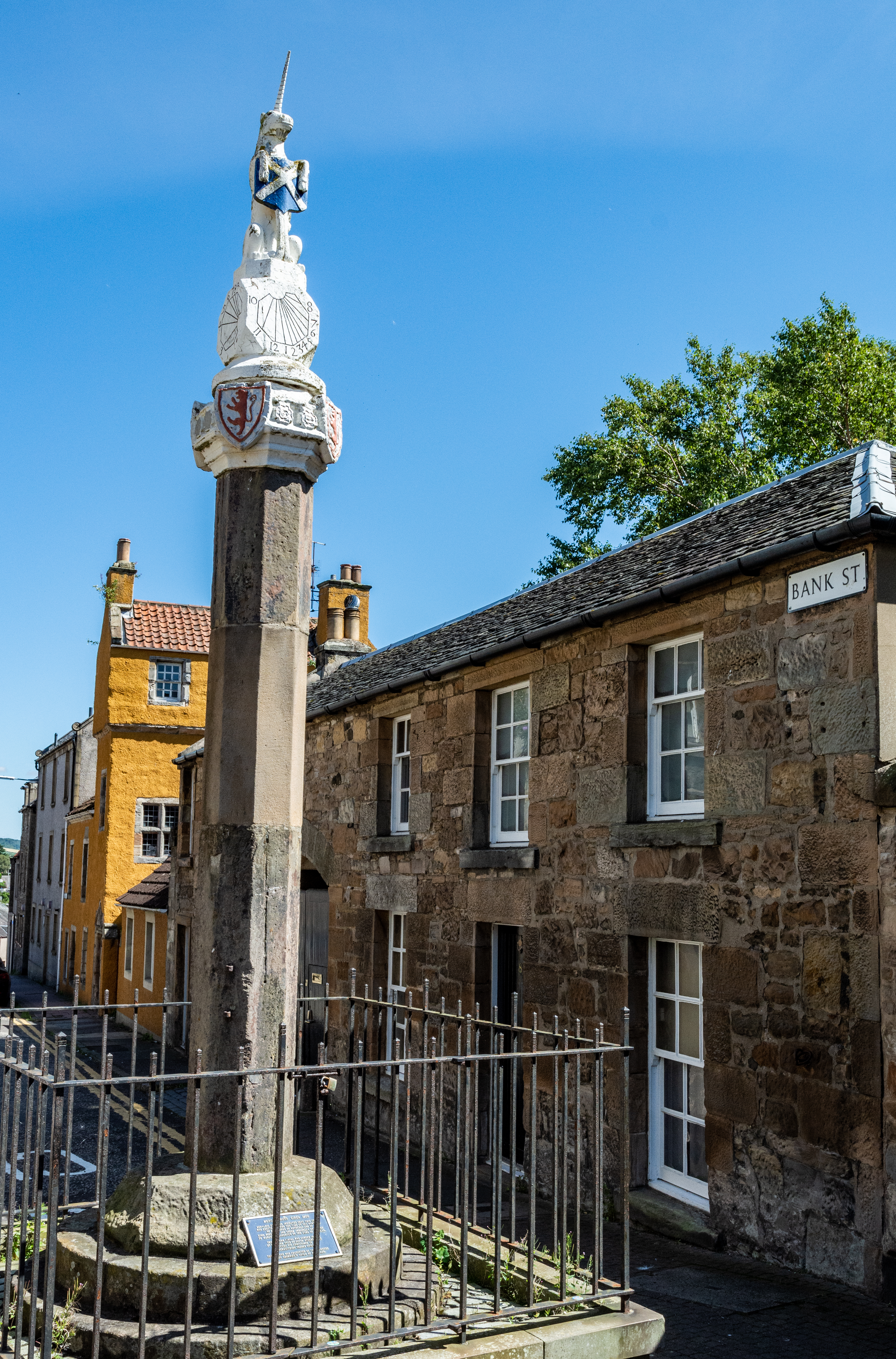
The Mercat Cross of Inverkeithing

Mosman worked for the households of King James IV and the queen consort Margaret Tudor supplying medicines and spices, herbal remedies, and providing treatments.

== Family background ==
Other members of the family were goldsmiths, including John Mosman who worked for James V and his son James Mosman, who built the house in Edinburgh known as the "John Knox House". It has been suggested that the Mosman family was of Jewish origin. A branch of the family including a John Mosman and his son Robert Mosman was recorded in February 1490 in connection with their tenancy of the lands of "Easter Gledstanis".

== Career ==
Mosman received a regular fee of £10 from the royal treasurer by 1513. A copy of a household roll of the Scottish court made around 1507 names him and William Foular as the court "pottingaris". "Pottingar" is an old Scots language word for apothecary.

=== Royal wedding ===
In April 1503 Mosman was sent to Flanders to buy materials for the king. This "stuff" may have been connected with the royal wedding. Mosman supplied sweetened and spiced "Hippocras" wine at the Edinburgh wedding of James IV and Margaret Tudor at Holyrood Palace, at a cost of 18 Scottish shillings. The English herald John Young, who wrote an account of her journey to Scotland, said there was "plenty of Ypocras", served in fellowship to the 41 men that James IV knighted for the queen.

=== Healing and medical practice ===
In November 1505 there was a plague scare in Dunfermline while Margaret Tudor was at Dunfermline Palace. Mosman looked after four African people, known as the "More lasses" and probably including Ellen More, at North Queensferry and Inverkeithing.

In August 1505 he helped to heal the arm of Elizabeth Barlay, an English lady in waiting to Margaret Tudor, who married Lord Elphinstone. Mosman was paid 14 shillings for his travelling expenses to Edinburgh "to mak potingary for Mastres Barleis arme."

Mosman was supplied with glass jugs and urinals on 13 September 1505. He went to Stirling Castle in November to fetch a rare imported "must cat". In June 1513 he sent spices for Margaret Tudor to Linlithgow Palace.

=== Fifth element project ===
He was involved in the king's project to make the fifth element, the "quinta essentia" with furnaces at Holyrood Palace and Stirling Castle. He supplied materials to the alchemists in January 1508 and in January 1513 was given a crown weight in gold to the quintessence. The others alchemists at Stirling were supervised by the Captain of the Castle Andrew Aytoun, and included Caldwell, Valentine McLellane, and the Italian John Damian, who is known for his attempt at flying, the subject of a poem by William Dunbar, The Fenyeit Freir of Tungland. The royal accounts include payments to Mosman for constructing furnaces in December 1503 and for bellows.

The "quintessence" was an imagined healing substance with some of the properties of distilled alcohol or aqua vitae, particularly associated with the 14th-century French alchemist Jean de Roquetaillade. James IV's furnaces may have been intended to represent an image of successful rule and well-being to the king's subjects, his command of supernatural and literal elemental force.

The idea of the quintessence was well known in the sixteenth century. In England, Henry VII was also interested in alchemy. He rewarded a "stranger of Perpignan that shewed quinta essentia" in January 1499, and employed a "multiplier" to make gold in the Tower of London. In 1586 Queen Elizabeth I joked that James VI had leapt to conclusions and so made a "quintessence of some humours" to taste a "sour liquid".

The dates of John Mosman's birth and death are unknown.

== Apothecaries in Early Modern Scotland ==
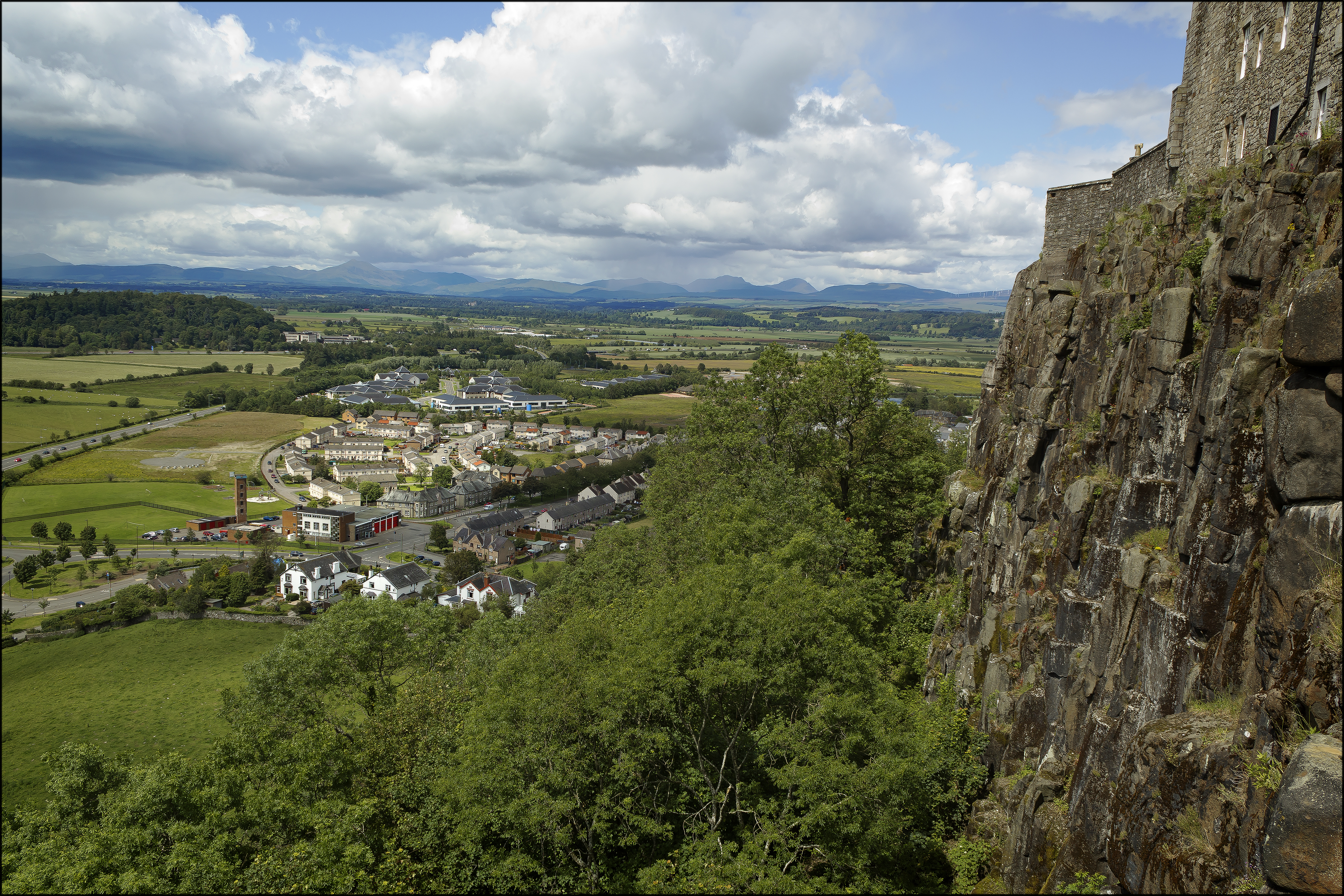
John Mosman worked at Stirling Castle

Another apothecary, William Foular, also served Margaret Tudor. She suffered from nosebleeds, and Foular provided a blood stone or heliotrope as a remedy. Foular also sent the queen medicinal spices including pepper, cinnamon, "cubebarum", and "galiga", with glass urinals. He made citron comfits for the king. Foular had a royal pension of 20 merks paid from the customs of Edinburgh, and was exempted from the burdens of civic duties.

In the 1590s the Scottish court was served by the apothecary Alexander Barclay.
