= John Holt (English educator) =

English educator

John Holt (died 1504) of Chichester, Sussex, was an English educator to the future Henry VIII of England. He was a close friend of Thomas More and wrote a schoolboy textbook on Latin grammar. He was educated at Magdalen College, Oxford.
