= Alexander Elphinstone, 1st Lord Elphinstone =

Scottish peer (died 1513)

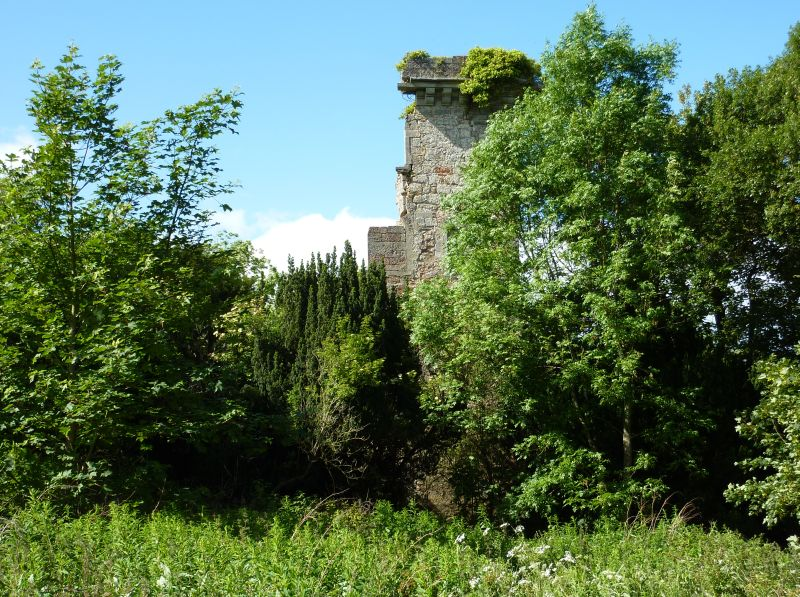
Ruins of Elphinstone Tower in 2009

Alexander Elphinstone, 1st Lord Elphinstone (died 9 September 1513) was a Scottish peer. He was the son of Sir John Elphinstone of that ilk and of Pittendreich.

== Courtier and administrator ==
He was first known as "Alexander Elphinstone of Innernochty". As a courtier, in 1508 Elphinstone was recorded as a "squire of attendance". He was made Baillie or Chamberlain of Stirlingshire in January 1508, in succession to Andrew Aytoun. He also became keeper of Stirling Castle, a position held jointly with his wife, Elizabeth Barlay. They supervised some repairs and building work.

Elphinstone was made a Lord of Parliament at the baptism of Prince Arthur, a son of James IV and Margaret Tudor in 1509. He was raised to the Peerage of Scotland as Lord Elphinstone, of Elphinstone in the County of Stirling, in 1510. This was a new creation. On the lands of the new barony of Elphinstone a new tower was erected called the tower of Elphinstone, which became the principal messuage of the new barony. It formed the chief residence of the Lords Elphinstone for eight generations of the family down to, and including Charles the ninth Lord.

== Squire of the Black Lady ==
Alexander Elphinstone played a "Squire of the Black Lady" at the royal tournament in Edinburgh in 1507. The role was to escort the "Black Lady" in her triumphal chair from Edinburgh Castle to the tournament ground. Elphinstone and his companion William Ogilvy were dressed in outfits of white damask.

== Marriage ==
Elphinstone married Elizabeth Barlay or Barlow, an English lady of the household of Margaret Tudor. The royal accounts for 1503 and 1506 include her fee of 50 English shillings for six months. She injured her arm in August 1505 and was attended by the royal apothecary, John Mossman. As a New Year's Day gift in 1507 she was given rosary beads. Her two maidens, her attendants, were given 5 French gold crowns each in January 1512, and the same gift was given to an African servant of the queen, Ellen More.

Elphinstone and Elizabeth Barlay were made keepers of Stirling Castle in January 1508. James IV also made them keepers of Kildrummy Castle. In 1508 they transferred their rights over lands at the Wester town of Tillicoultry known as Colinstoun to James Schaw of Sauchie and his wife Alison Home. In 1513 Kildrummy was regranted to him and his wife and united with Innernochty into the Lordship of Elphinstone.

== Flodden ==
In 1512 Elphinstone was able to help Robert Bruce of Airth to recover his lands at the Pool of Airth, where James IV had built a dockyard.

Lord Elphinstone was killed at the Battle of Flodden in September 1513, along with many other Scottish noblemen, and was succeeded in the lordship by his son Alexander.

According to George Buchanan, Elphinstone was clothed in royal insignia at the battle. Because he was not unlike James IV in stature, there was a rumour that Elphinstone had been mistaken for the king, who had been able to escape the battlefield incognito. Buchanan also reported that there was doubt if the body recovered by the English at Flodden was Elphinstone's or James IV.

== Children ==
The children of Alexander Elphinstone and Elizabeth Barlay included:

- Alexander Elphinstone, 2nd Lord Elphinstone
- Euphemia Elphinstone, who was a mistress of King James V of Scotland and mother of the royal bastard Robert Stewart, 1st Earl of Orkney. She married John Bruce of Cultmalindie and was the mother of Laurence Bruce, builder of Muness Castle.

Elizabeth Barlow or Barlay, Lady Elphinstone, later married John Forbes, 6th Lord Forbes.

Peerage of Scotland
| New creation | Lord Elphinstone; 1509–1513 | Succeeded by Alexander Elphinstone |
