= Sujata Iyengar =

British-Indian professor

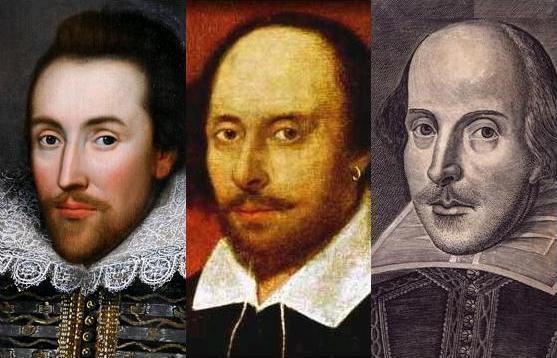
Portraits of William Shakespeare, the subject of Iyengar's scholarship

Sujata Iyengar (born 1970) is a British-Indian-American professor and scholar of William Shakespeare, English Renaissance literature, and Shakespeare adaptations.

She received her PhD from Stanford University and is a professor at the University of Georgia. Iyengar is the author of books including Shades of Difference, Shakespeare's Medical Language, and Shakespeare and Adaptation Theory. She is co-founder and co-editor of the academic journal Borrowers and Lenders: The Journal of Shakespeare and Appropriation.

== Bibliography ==
- Shades of Difference: Mythologies of Skin Color and Race in Early Modern England (University of Pennsylvania Press, 2005)
- Shakespeare's Medical Language (Bloomsbury/Arden, 2011)
- Disability, Health, and Happiness in the Shakespearean Body (Routledge, 2015)
- Shakespeare and Global Appropriation (Routledge, 2020)
- Shakespeare and Adaptation Theory (Bloomsbury/Arden, 2023)
