= Ane Dance in the Quenis Chalmer =

Ane Dance in the Quenis Chalmer or A dance in the Queen's chamber is a humorous or satiric Scots poem by William Dunbar.

The verses describe a dance in the chamber of Margaret Tudor, wife of King James IV. Various courtiers are introduced and their dance moves described in comic terms. The refrain, in modern spelling is, "A merrier dance might no man see". Dancers include Master Robert Schaw who provided medicinal recipes to the queen's apothecary William Foular, and appears to have been a physician serving the women of the court. Perhaps to widen the appeal of the poem for a court audience that may have include the subjects of the satire, Dunbar introduces himself as a dancer who clumsily sheds a slipper or panton.

== Sir John Sinclair ==
Sir Jhon Sinclair begowthe to dance,
For he was new cum owt of France.
For ony thing that he do mycht
The an futt yeid ay onrycht
And to the tother wald nocht gree.
Quod an, "Tak up the quenis knycht!"

A mirrear dance mycht na man see.

Sinclair was an attendant of Margaret Tudor. In April 1513 an English diplomat, Nicholas West, came to Linlithgow Palace and was met by John Sinclair, who conveyed him to Margaret Tudor. He may have been the Scottish courtier recorded in November 1490 and January 1491 playing cards with James IV.

== Dunbar and Mistress Musgrave ==
Than cam in Dunbar the mackar
On all the flure thair was nan frackar
And thair he dancet the dirrye dantoun.
He hoppet lyk a pillie wanton,
For luff of Musgraeffe, men tellis me.
He trippet quhill he tint his panton.

A mirrear dance mycht na man see.

Than cam in Maesteres Musgraeffe
Schou mycht heff lernit all the laeffe.
Quhen I schau hir sa trimlye dance,
Hir guid convoy and contenance,
Than for hir saek I wissitt to be
The grytast erle or duk in France.

A mirrear dance mycht na man see.

Than cam in dame Dounteboir -
God waett gif that schou louket sowr.
Schou maid sic morgeownis with hir hippis,
For lachtter nain mycht hald thair lippis.
Quhen schou was danceand bisselye,
An blast of wind son fra hir slippis.

A mirrear dance mycht na man see.

In these verses Dunbar imagines himself in the dance, and reveals his affection for Mistress Musgrave, or Musgrove, an English lady in waiting and Mistress of the Queen's wardrobe, despite their disparity in social status. She was probably the wife of Sir John Musgrave. She was known as the "Lady Mastres", the Lady Mistress. As a New Year's Day gift in 1507 she received a brooch with an image of Saint Michael set with a diamond. In February she brought James IV the news of the birth of his son at Linlithgow Palace. In June 1508 she helped with preparations for a dance at Holyroodhouse to conclude the tournament of the Wild Knight and the Black Lady. Details of her clothing, made by the Queen's tailor Robert Spittell survive in the accounts from 1511 and 1512.

Edward Hall's English chronicle and a poem Flodden Field mention a "Giles Musgrave", presumably a relation of her husband, who is said to have persuaded James IV to move from an advantageous position on a hill at the battle of Flodden.
