= Kim F. Hall =

American academic (born 1961)

Kim F. Hall is the Lucyle Hook professor of English and professor of Africana Studies at Barnard College. She was born in 1961 in Baltimore. She is an expert on black feminist studies, critical race theory, early modern and Renaissance literature.

== Education ==
Hall was educated at Hood College as an undergraduate, then undertook postgraduate study at the University of Pennsylvania, where she gained a PhD in sixteenth and seventeenth century English literature.

== Career ==
Kim F. Hall published her first book Things of Darkness in 1996 by Cornell University Press – she took a black feminist approach in interpreting Renaissance Literature.

Hall taught at the University of Pennsylvania, Swarthmore College, and Georgetown University, then held the Thomas F.X. Mullarkey Chair of Literature at Fordham University before becoming a member of the Barnard faculty in 2006. She assumed the Lucyle Hook Chair at Barnard in 2010.

In 2016 she received a grant from the National Endowment for the Humanities to carry out research for her book, "Othello Was My Grandfather": Shakespeare and Race in the African Diaspora. Also in 2016, she gave the Folger Institute's Shakespeare Anniversary lecture, on the same topic. In 2017 she delivered the Paul Gottschalk Memorial Lecture at Barnard College. Her lecture was entitled '"Intelligently organized resistance": Shakespeare in the diasporic politics of John E. Bruce'.

== Selected publications ==
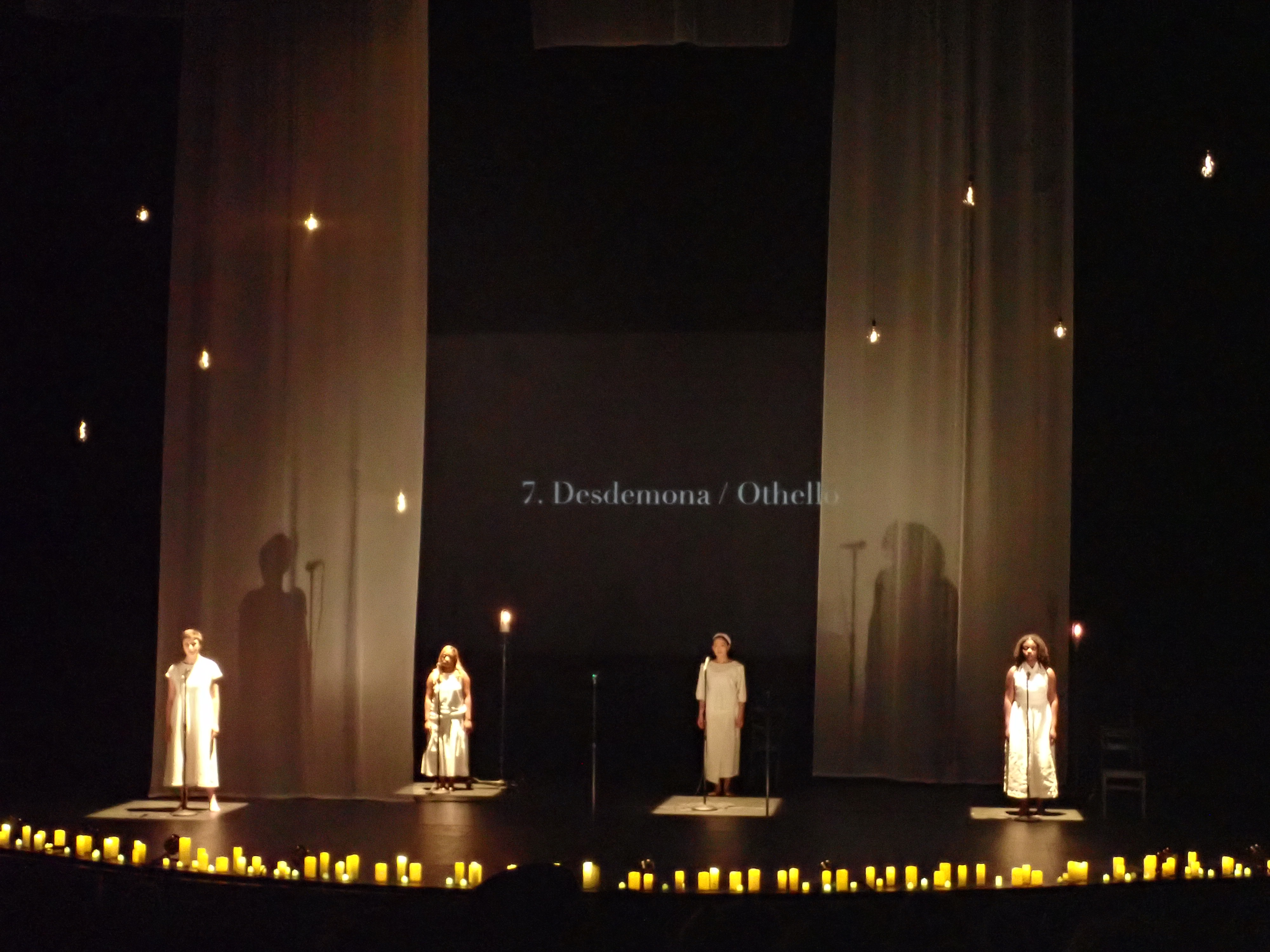
A moment from the performance of Toni Morrison's Desdemona at Cornell University in 2023. Hall examines this play and Keith Hamilton Cobb’s American Moor in her chapter "Can You be White and Hear This?: The Racial Art of Listening in American Moor and Desdemona" (2023).

- Things of Darkness: Economies of Race and Gender in Early Modern England (Ithaca and London: Cornell University Press, 1995).
- Othello: Texts and Contexts (St. Martin's Press, 2006).
- "'Use Words, Not Your Body': The hunger that has no name", Women and Performance: a Journal of Feminist Theory 18:2 (2008): 169–180. Nominated for the Association for Theatre in Higher Education (ATHE) Outstanding Article Award.
- (ed., with Christine Cynn) "Rewriting Dispersal: Africana Gender Studies." Scholar & Feminist Online. 7.2 (Spring 2009).
- (ed., with Monica L. Miller and Yvette Christiansë) "The Worlds of Ntozake Shange." S & F Online. 12.3-13.1 (Summer 2014/Fall 2014).
- (ed., with Peter Erickson) Shakespeare Quarterly. special issue on Early Modern Race Studies. 67.1 (2016).
- "Can You Be White and Hear This?: The Racial Art of Listening in American Moor and Desdemona", Ed. Arthur L. Little, Jr., In White People in Shakespeare, 219–234. (London: Bloomsbury Publishing Plc, 2023).
