= James Ogilvie of Cardell =

Scottish courtier (died 1574)

James Ogilvie of Cardell (died 1574) was a Scottish courtier, a master of household to Mary, Queen of Scots, his inheritance of Findlater Castle was disputed by John Gordon.

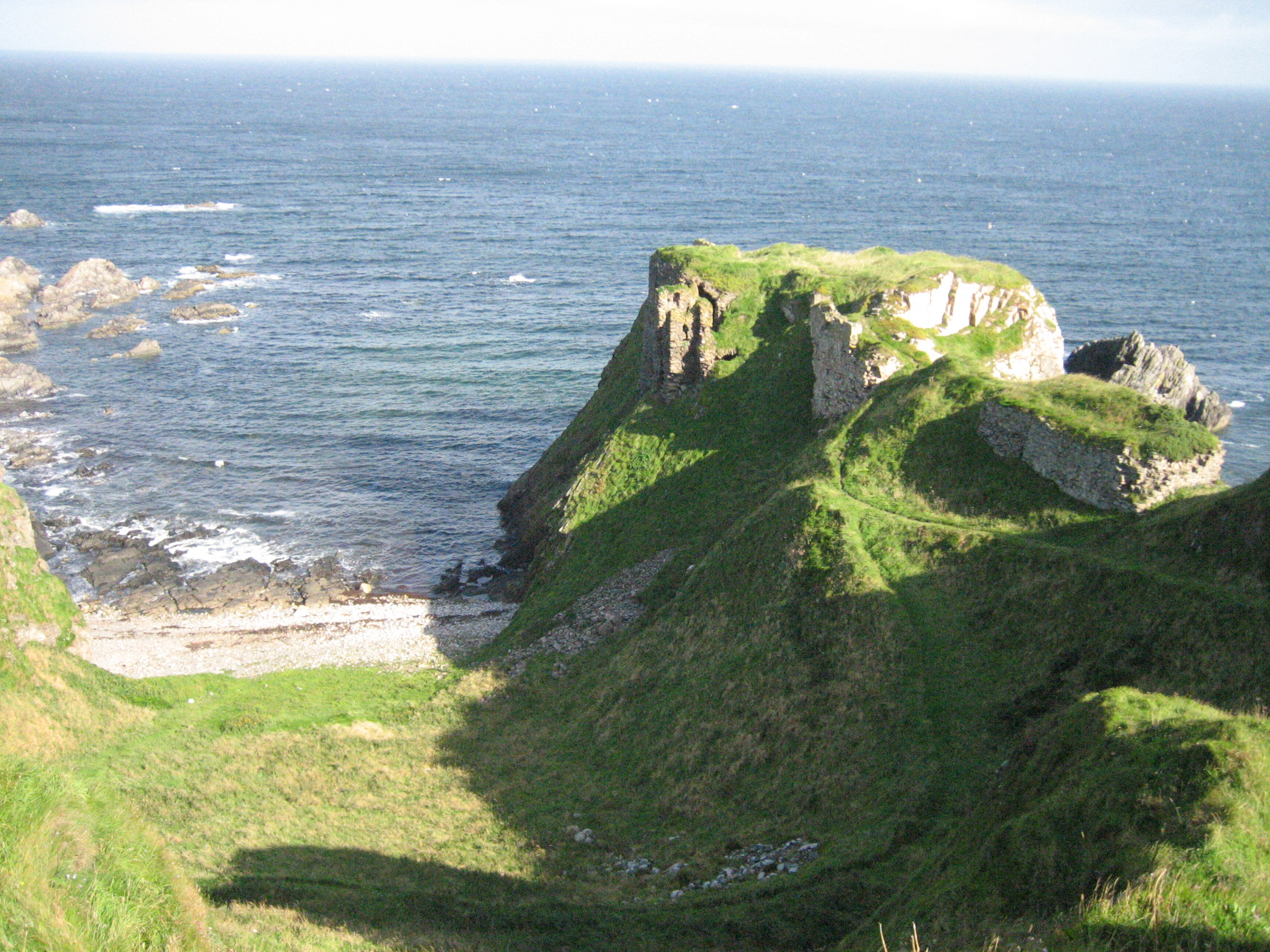
The ownership of Findlater Castle was disputed

== Family and lands ==
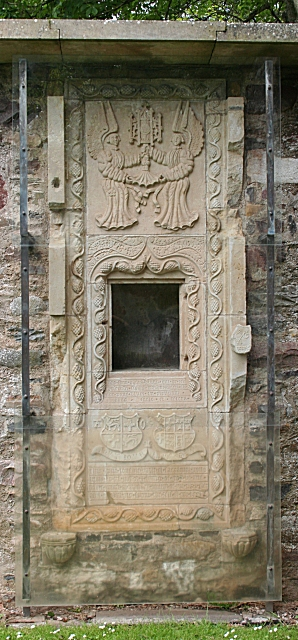
Alexander Ogilvie and Elizabeth Gordon commissioned a "sacrament house" at Deskford Kirk

He was a son of Alexander Ogilvie (died 1554) of Findlater Castle and Janet Abernethy. Alexander Ogilvie served in the household of Mary of Guise in the 1540s. He and his second wife Elizabeth Gordon, Lady Findlater (a daughter of Adam Gordon, Dean of Caithness), commissioned a carved stone sacrament house at Deskford and an unusual and lavish monument in Cullen Old Kirk.

Cardell, according to William Fraser, also known as Pitcroy, included Cardell-moir, Cardell-beg, a mill, and fishing on the Spey located in Knockando parish. The property was held in feu by James Ogilvie from the Friars in Elgin from 1527 to 1539, when Friars gave it in feu to Alexander Grant instead. The lands are now known as Cardhu or Cardow, noted for a woolmill and a distillery. However, a royal charter made to James Ogilvie in February 1535 indicates that the barony of "Cardale" included lands located in the southern area of Inverness such as Holm, Brodland (Borlum), Lochardil, and a castle mound. These lands had belonged to Alexander Ogilvie of Farr and Cullard and his wife Margaret Dennet.

Alexander Ogilvie disinherited James Ogilvie in 1545 in favour of John Gordon, a son of George Gordon, 4th Earl of Huntly. On 28 September 1545, John Gordon obtained a royal charter permitting him to use the name and arms of Ogilvie, and confirming him as heir of Alexander Ogilvie and Elizabeth Gordon. According to the English diplomat Thomas Randolph, James Ogilvie had seduced or traduced his stepmother Elizabeth Gordon, Lady Findlater, and imprisoned his father in a dark house and deprived him of sleep. Later, John Gordon married Lady Findlater to secure his property (the Privy Council called her "his pretended spouse"), and then, according to Randolph, locked her in a "close room".

John Gordon's brother, Alexander Gordon, had attempted to mediate in 1549. He wrote to Mary of Guise that John Gordon would agree the matter with James Ogilvie when he returned from France. In 1551, apparently to eject John Gordon from his uncle's property, Alexander Irvine, Master of Drum, captured Findlater Castle and John Gordon, but was declared a traitor by Regent Arran's government. James Ogilvie was in France in 1551. John Gordon was confirmed as the landholder in December 1552.

Mary of Guise, as Regent of Scotland, who had perceived the "evill" done to James by his father, attempted to provide a settlement for this dispute on 21 May 1556. In May 1560, when she was at Edinburgh Castle, Guise sent the "laird of Findlater" and the advocate Master John Spence of Condie to negotiate with the Lords of the Congregation and the English commanders at the siege of Leith. They met at the Justice Clerk's mill.

Subsequently, in June 1562, James Ogilvie and John Gordon fought over their rights in court and on the High Street of Edinburgh. James, Lord Ogilvie was wounded in the arm. The fight was noted by Thomas Randolph and John Knox. Gordon was briefly imprisoned in the tolbooth of Edinburgh, and Ogilvie was detained in the "over council house" with a kinsman James Ogilvie of Balfour. Mary, Queen of Scots, restored the inheritance to James Ogilvie in 1563, as the baronies of Deskford and Findlater.

== Mary of Guise's household ==
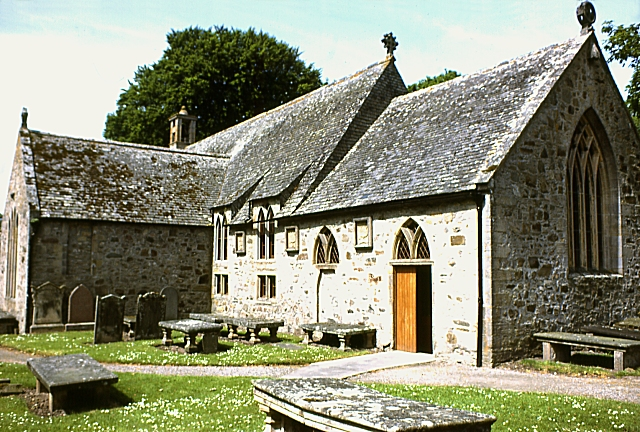
Mary, Queen of Scots, is said to have held a meeting to reconcile the feuding families at Cullen Kirk.

James Ogilvie appears in the household rolls of Mary of Guise, in the years after the death of James V, as "the son of the laird of Findlater". Ogilvie witnessed a band of friendship made between the Earl of Huntly and William, Lord Saltoun, at Edinburgh on 27 March 1543. In 1543, he made a band of friendship with Walter Ogilvie of Dunlugus, a kinsman included in Guise's household roll as "Watur Ogliby". Dunlugus signed the "Secret Bond" in July 1543 in opposition to the policy of Regent Arran, which led to Mary being taken from Linlithgow Palace to Stirling Castle.

James Ogilvie's second wife, Marion or Marjory Livingstone was also a member of Guise's household. According to family tradition, she served as mistress of the robes to Mary, Queen of Scots, in France. A dress belonging to her was preserved at Cullen House until 1746.

== Mary's return to Scotland ==
Mary, Queen of Scots, appointed Ogilvie as her steward on 9 October 1560 at Château de Saint-Germain-en-Laye. On 12 January 1561, Mary sent him to Edinburgh with Simon Preston of Craigmillar, John Lumsden of Blanerne, and Robert Leslie of Ardersier with a commission to hold a parliament. She wanted the parliament to appoint a new comptroller and treasurer to collect her rents in advance of her return to Scotland. The four commissioners arrived at Craigmillar Castle on 20 February and spoke with William Maitland of Lethington and went to Linlithgow on 23 February to speak to James Hamilton, Duke of Châtellerault and James Hamilton, 3rd Earl of Arran. Thomas Randolph heard reports of the discussions about Queen Mary's return but was sceptical of what he heard and the commissioners' sincerity.

=== Master of household ===
Ogilvie served as a master of household to Queen Mary in 1562 and took receipt of 60 small English pewter plates. The exchequer rolls mention a household book, recording daily expenses on food, countersigned by Ogilvie, Bartholomew de Villemore, and George Seton, 7th Lord Seton. Lord Seton was Mary's "first master household". The expenses for 12 months to November 1563 were £11,486 Scots. Ogilvie's annual fee as master of the household was £200.

In October 1565, Ogilvy was found to have neglected his duties. The masters of household were required to attend and serve in terms, and Ogilvy had ignored his summons. It was also noted that he had shirked attendance during the Chaseabout Raid. His post as master of household was given to Gilbert Balfour of Westray. Ogilvy and Findlater officiated with Francisco de Busso as masters of the royal household in the Great Hall of Stirling Castle during the baptism of Prince James in December 1566.

=== Mary's Scottish itinerary ===
At this time the household accounts were written in French, and the surviving material in the National Records of Scotland is known as the Despences de la Maison Royale. The historian George Chalmers obtained a translation of the record including the dates and places visited, which he used to establish Mary's itinerary. He called his abstract "Ogilvie's diary" or "journal", which has led to some confusion. The account includes Mary's visit to Cullen and the Craig of Boyne (19 September 1562). A full itinerary was published by David Hay Fleming in 1897, using dates and placenames from the registers of the privy seal. This was revised and updated in 1988 by Edward Furgol.

== Progress and campaign in 1562 ==
James Ogilvie joined Mary in her progress to the north in 1562 and was at the siege of Inverness Castle. He signed the daily expense account known as the Despences. The aim of the progress was in part to restore and secure his inheritance. John Gordon, who was now called the "laird of Findlater", and had recently been knighted as "John Ogilvy of Deskford" at the wedding of the Earl of Moray and Annas Keith, refused to surrender Auchindoun Castle and Findlater Castle to James Ogilvie or Queen Mary. Some later authors claim Mary held a meeting to reconcile the parties at Cullen Kirk, possibly when she visited on 19 September 1562. The meeting was said to have been at the altar of St Anne, meaning the south aisle of St Mary's Kirk.

John Gordon's men defeated a detachment of the royal guard led by Captain Stewart near Findlater in October 1562 and took their weapons. Robert Lindsay of Pitscottie wrote that this incident happened at Banff. While Mary was at Aberdeen, the Earl of Huntly sent a messenger to offer the keys of Auchindoun and Findlater, but this gesture was rejected.

John Gordon was captured at the battle of Corrichie and executed at Aberdeen on 3 November. John Lesley wrote that Mary shed tears at the news of the death of the Earl of Huntly, and her grief was increased at the execution of John Gordon. Robert Gordon of Gordonstoun wrote that Mary pleaded with the Earl of Moray that he should be saved. He had been a favourite, even rumoured as a possible husband for Queen Mary. According to the Historie of the Reigne of Marie Queen of Scots, John Gordon's mother, Elizabeth Keith, Countess of Huntly, "a wittie woman", had tried to bring up the subject of this royal marriage with Queen Mary at Aberdeen, before the battle of Corrichie. The poet Pierre de Bocosel de Chastelard mentioned Mary's affection for John Gordon.

== An inheritance restored ==
James Ogilvie got a charter for the lands in January 1563, but Adam Gordon of Auchindoun attempted to claim the estates. By an arbitration in July 1564, Elizabeth Gordon was allowed a liferent interest in Auchindoun Castle and other properties including fishing boats in Cullen. Queen Mary backed James Ogilvie's rights again at an arbitration on 22 March 1567, and had his ownership ratified in Parliament on 18 April 1567.

On 8 May 1568, James Ogilvie signed a band made at Hamilton in support of Queen Mary after her escape from Lochleven Castle. He signed as "Findlater".

== Jean Gordon and William Mackintosh ==
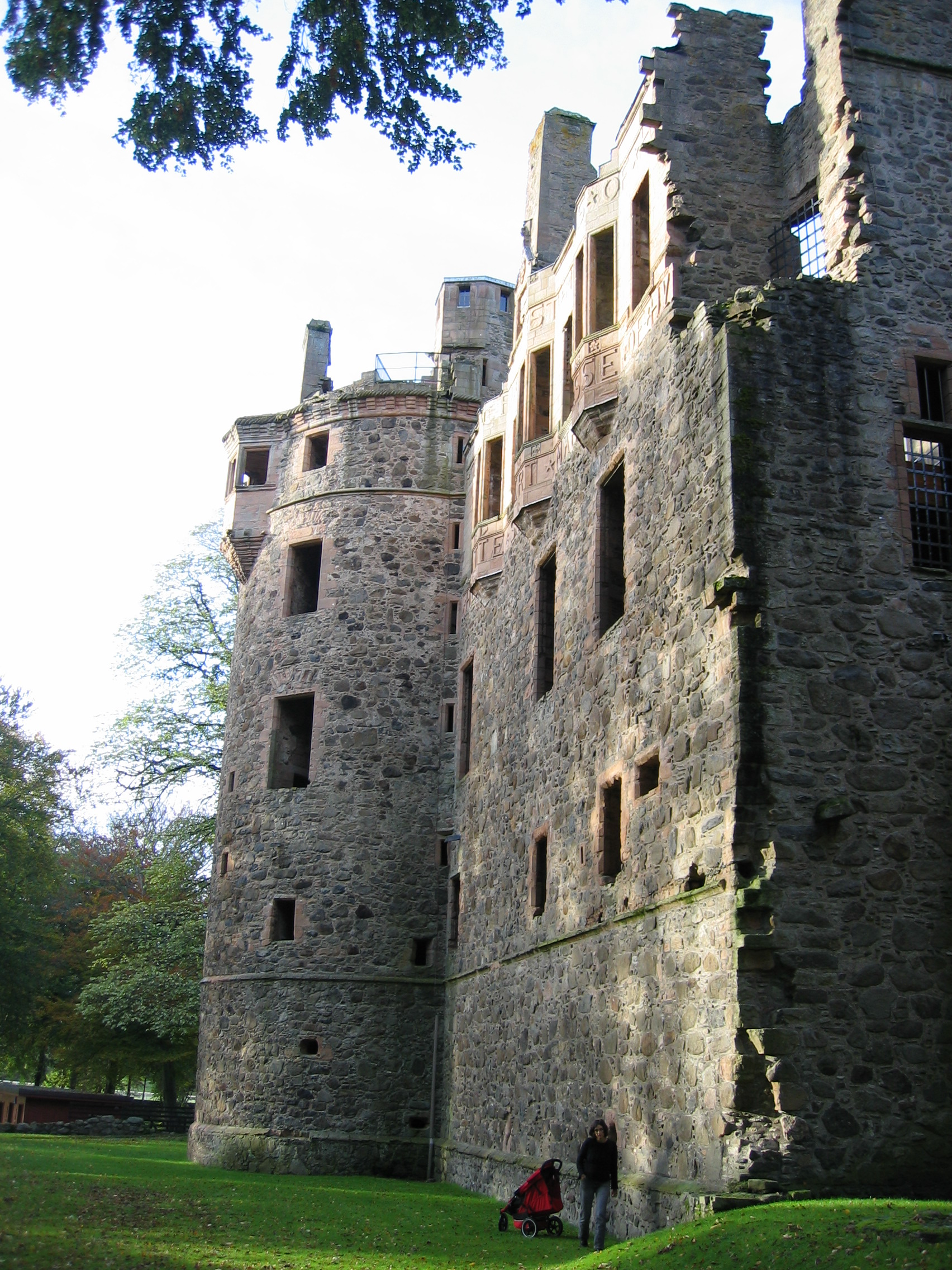
William Mackintosh was imprisoned and executed at Huntly Castle.

The connections of the Ogilvies to the Clan Mackintosh are mentioned in John Lesley's History of Scotland and a Latin manuscript, De Origine et Incremento Makintoshiorum Epitome collected by Walter MacFarlane.

By 1527, James Ogilvie of Cardell married Jonet or Jean Gordon, a daughter of Alexander Gordon of Lochinvar and Janet Kennedy, and widow of Lachlan Mackintosh. She was a half-sister of James Stewart, 1st Earl of Moray (1501 creation). After Lachlan Mackintosh was assassinated in March 1524 (at a hunting seat at "Breravock" or Brae of Revack, south of Grantown-on-Spey), Jean and Lachlan's son William Mackintosh was brought up for a time at Findlater Castle in the Ogilvie family.

Hector Mackintosh resented this fostering of William Mackintosh, and raided the lands of the Earl of Moray in 1531 killing 24 Ogilvies at the House of Pettie or Halhill, which was sited near the later Castle Stuart. John Lesley describes the Earl of Moray, after obtaining royal authority from James V, hanging numbers of the Clan Mackintosh while trying to discover Hector's hiding place. Hector's brother's head was displayed on a stake in Dyke. James V was inclined to pardon Hector, but he was murdered in St Andrews by James Spens.

According to some accounts, William Mackintosh married James Ogilvie's sister Margaret. James V had given the rights of William's marriage as a ward to Elizabeth Campbell, Countess of Moray in June 1538.

After working for the Earl of Huntly for some years, following disagreements, William Mackintosh was imprisoned at Huntly Castle and at a trial in Aberdeen convicted of treason (as the Earl was the Queen's lieutenant in the north). Mackintosh was brought back to Huntly and beheaded in August 1550 at the order of Elizabeth Keith, Countess of Huntly. His widow, Margaret Ogilvie, according to some accounts, then married Robert Mor Munro. According to John Lesley, the Clan Chattan took revenge on Lachlan Mackintosh (a son of one of those who murdered William's father in 1524) believing him the cause of William's downfall.

== Marjory Livingstone, Lady Findlater ==
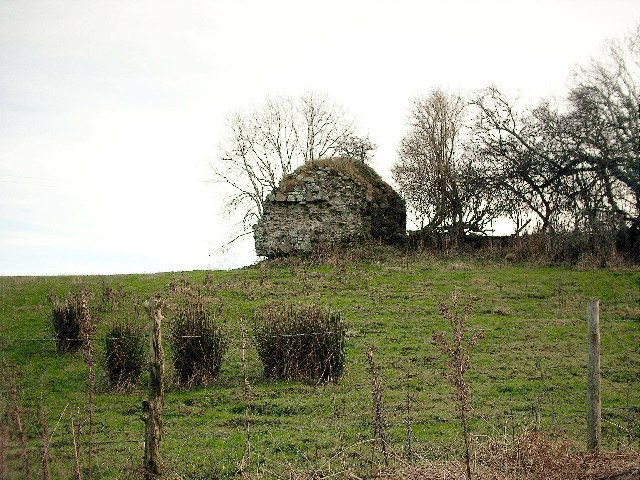
Inaltry Castle, near Deskford

James Ogilvie married secondly, in 1558, Marion or Marjory Livingstone, a sister of William Livingstone, 6th Lord Livingston and the courtiers Mary Livingston and Magdalen Livingstone. Ogilvie calls his wife Marjory in his will. She had been a gentlewoman or maid of honour in the household of Mary of Guise, listed as a "damoiselle", and receiving in February 1553 with her companions Barbara Sandilands and Annabell Murray a gown of "tanny" damask. His kinsman and ally, James Ogilvie of Balfour, married Margaret Stewart in 1554, who was also a member of Guise's household.

He had a son, Alexander, who was the father of Walter Ogilvie, 1st Lord Ogilvie of Deskford (died 1626). Marjory Livingstone died at Inaultrie in February 1577. Her will was witnessed by John Pilmour, reader at Deskford. She owned a pair of gold garnishings "back and foir" to wear on a French hood, with bracelets, and two gold chains, great and small, 100 gold buttons and 144 gold horn fasteners or points. At the time of her death she owed Mary Beaton, the Lady of Boyne, £20 Scots. Marjory Livingston left her best gowns and a pair of sleeves of purple silk to her sister Helen's daughter Jane Wedderspoone. The gold garnishing and a gold tablet locket was bequeathed to Magdalen Livingstone. Marjorie left a length of velvet for a saddle to her sister Lady Plane, and a velvet gown, a satin skirt, and a pair of sleeves to her sister Janet, Lady Airth. She wished to buried in the kirk of Cullen beside her husband.

== In fiction ==
Mrs Hubert Barclay (Edith Nöel Barclay) wrote a fictional account of Mary's reign, The Queen's Cause: Scottish Narrative, 1561–1587 (1938), narrated by Margaret, Lady of Gartley, a sister of James Ogilvie of Cardell. She suggests that James was disinherited in 1545 for religious differences as he was a Protestant.
