= Margaret Dennet =

Margaret Dennet was an English servant of Margaret Tudor, the wife of James IV of Scotland, and the owner of lands near Inverness.

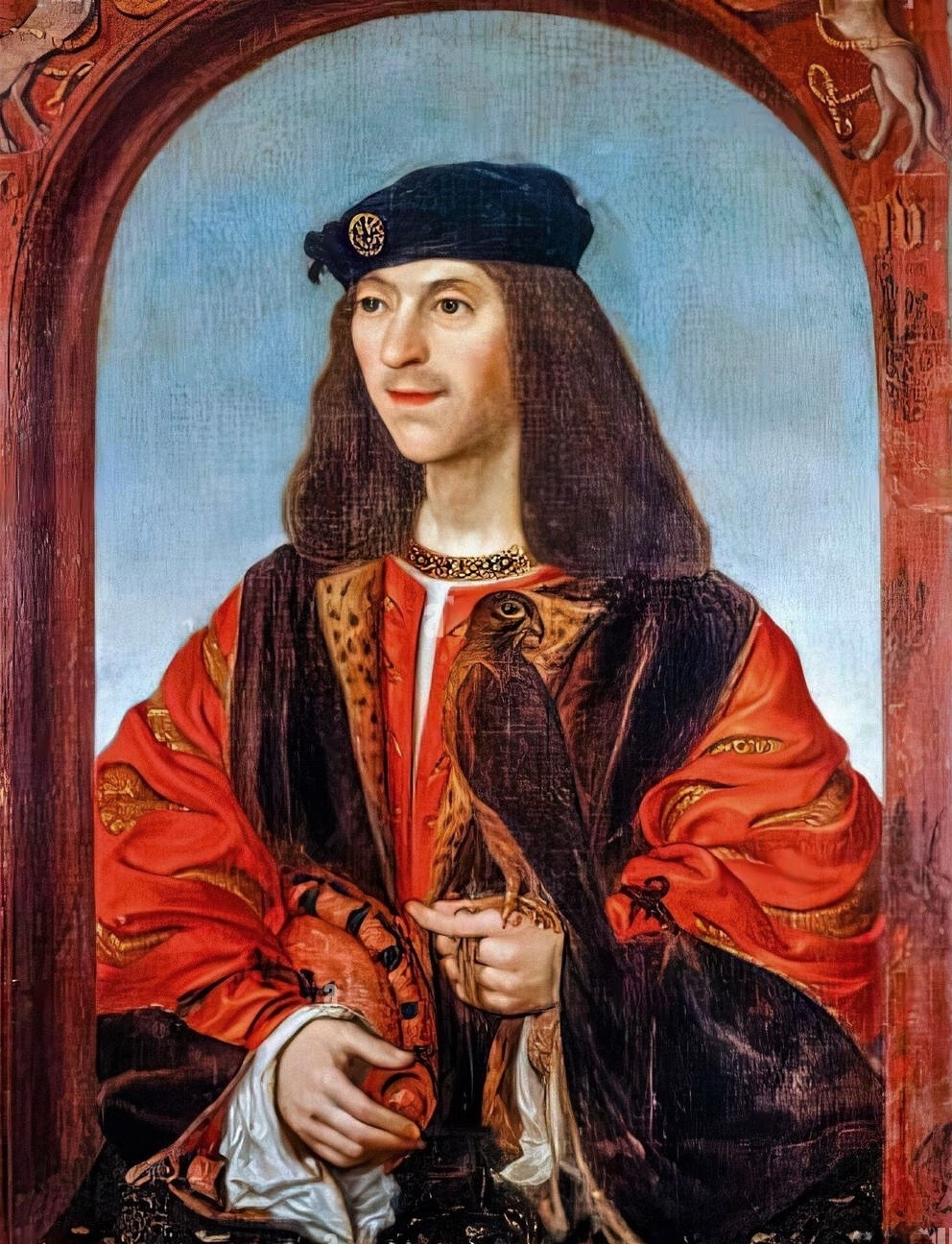
James IV gave Margaret Dennet a gold chain with a figure of St Andrew costing £20 Scots

Margaret Dennet was one of Margaret Tudor's English servants, a chamberer. The queen was allowed 24 English servants by her marriage contract. As a New Year's Day gift in January 1504, Margaret Dennet was a given a gold chain with a figure of St Andrew. This was a welcoming gift to Scotland. At £20 Scots, the gift was more expensive than those received by other women.

She married Sir Alexander Ogilvy of Farr and Cullard one of the king's squires. After her marriage, in October 1507 she was given lands in her husband's barony of Cardale including Holm just south of Inverness and the "fermes" of Cullard, Kaendchelye, and Bordland.

Margaret Dennet seems to have remained at court and was given satin for a gown in January 1508 when other courtiers including Elizabeth Berlay were given clothes. In January 1509 she was granted an income from fishing rights on the River Spey.

James Ogilvie of Cardell had a charter for the same lands near Inverness with the castle mound and castle at Brodland or Bordland in 1535, presumably after the death of Margaret Dennet. The lands included Borlum or Ness Castle, now part of Inverness. James Ogilvy was a son of Alexander Ogilvy of Findlater and Deskford, and Jonet Abernethy, a daughter of Lord Saltoun.
