= Matthew Auchinleck =

Matthew Auchinleck or Matho Auchlek was a Scottish goldsmith who worked for James IV of Scotland and Margaret Tudor.

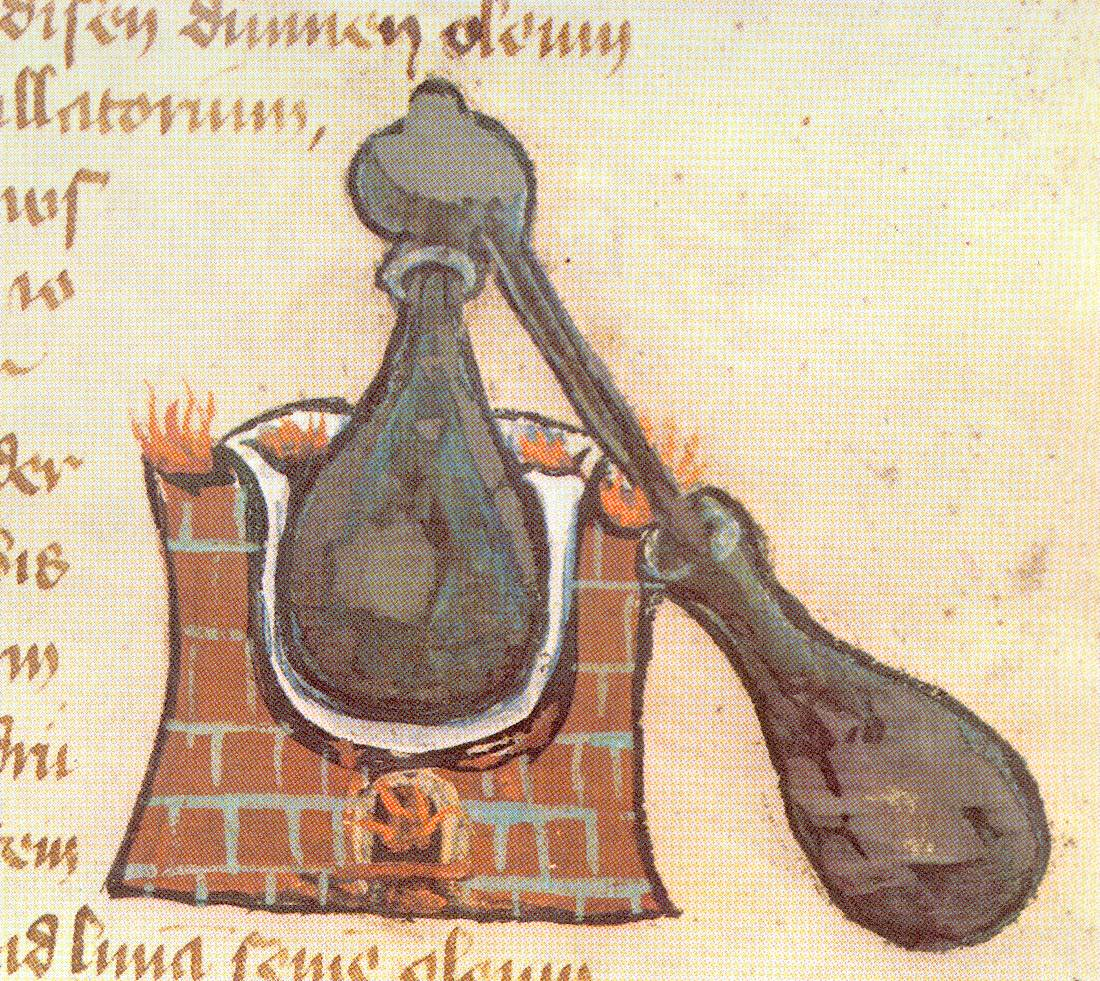
Matthew Auchinleck made silver fittings for an alembic or "stellatour" used by alchemists at Stirling Castle

Auchinleck, and his father "Matho Auchinlek" the elder, were put in charge of the mint by James IV and sent in their accounts in April 1507. John Auchlek, a relation, was also a goldsmith working for the court. Their business was in Stirling, and they set up a shop and workshop in Edinburgh called a "buith" in July 1503.

In December 1501, the treasurer of Scotland provided Matthew Auchinleck senior with two pounds of borax, six pounds of copper, two pounds of grease called "crechis", and wire. James IV bought a ring from "Matho Auchlekkis son" in July 1502. Expenses were paid for "litill Matho Auchlek" travelling between Stirling and Edinburgh with the king's armour in July 1503.

John Auchinleck made gold buttons or fasteners called "malzeis" for the king's doublets and women's gowns worn at the wedding of James IV and Margaret Tudor. Her crown was made by another goldsmith, John Currour, and Matthew Auchinleck repaired the king's crown. In the days after the wedding, Currour provided rings, a heart of gold, an image of the Virgin Mary and a gold cross for Margaret Tudor. Currour also made a unicorn jewel for James VI with a pendant pearl.

According to Robert Lindsay of Pitscottie, prizes at the tournament of the Wild Knight and the Black Lady included gold and silver gilt weapons made as trophies. One of the king's gold chains was given to Matthew Auchinleck for gilding "prizes for the field".

In 1508, Matthew Auchinleck made a silver fitting for distillation equipment used by the king's alchemist Alexander Ogilvy at Stirling Castle. The piece was described in Scots as a "bos hed to ane stellatour of silvir". The alchemists had a furnace at the castle and were trying to make the fifth element known as "quinta essentia". Auchinleck supplied Ogilvy with materials including "burnt silver".

Matthew Auchinleck routinely mended and gilded the king's silver tableware and armour, and made jugs, reliquaries, and candlesticks. He repaired the king's crown in 1503 for the royal marriage and was involved in the work of the mint.
