= Holm Mills =

Holm Mills may refer to:

- Holm Mills, Hampshire, village in Hampshire, England
- Holm Mills (building), building in Holm, Inverness
