= John Currour =

John Currour was a goldsmith in Edinburgh who worked for James IV of Scotland and Margaret Tudor.

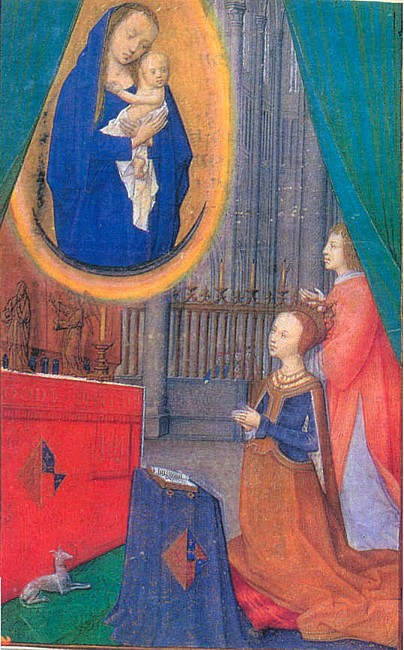
Margaret Tudor at prayer, attributed to Gerard Horenbout

== The mint and a hoard of silver ==
An Act of Parliament of 1493 mentions that John Currour other two other goldsmith-moneyers Gilbert Fish and "the late Livingstone" had previously coined some money, and their coins would continue to be honoured as legal tender. A John Currour paid a fee of composition to the crown in 1494 to acquire a hoard of silver found in Banff, where a branch of the Currour family resided at nearby Inchdrewer Castle..

== Royal wedding ==
In 1503, Currour made a crown for Margaret Tudor, and Matthew Auchinleck repaired the king's crown and made buttons for their costumes. Margaret's crown was made from 83 gold coins. An English herald described the crown as a "varey rich croune of gold garnished with pierrery and perlez".

In the days after the wedding, Currour provided rings, a heart of gold, an image of the Virgin Mary, and a gold cross for Margaret Tudor. Currour also made a unicorn jewel for James IV with a pendant pearl.

== New Year's Day gifts ==
In January 1504, Currour provided New Year's Day gifts, mended two collars with swans, supplied pearls for gold crosses which James IV gave to Margaret, and set a stone for the English "Lady Mistress" of the queen's household. This was either "Mistress Musgrave" or Joan, Lady Guildford. James IV had given a gold chain to Lady Guildford in October, and Margaret had written "Cest marguerite" in Lady Guildford's prayer book. Among the New Year's Day gifts in 1507, Currour provided a gold chain given to another English courtier Eleanor Verney.

== William Currour and the fight on the Royal Mile ==
In 1508, a kinsman William Currour was Deacon of the Edinburgh Goldsmiths. He was involved in a fight with two goldsmiths, James MacCalzean and William Lorimer alias Halfpennyman. Currour injured MacCalzean's mouth with his goldsmith's file and hurt Halfpennyman with his knife. Two servant goldsmiths from William Currour's workshop, John Mosman and John Bykat, were involved in the struggle on the High Street and guilty of "art and part" in the wounding. James IV granted Currour a remission for these offences on 8 July 1508.

== House on the Cowgate ==
John Currour took ownership of a house on the Cowgate by sasine in November 1509. The Confraternity of the Holy Blood commissioned him to make a eucharistic vessel for their altar in St Giles' Cathedral in October 1512. It was to be made of silver of the fineness of an English groat.

== Goldsmith's pageant ==
Currour gilded armour for James IV in November 1511. Thomas and William Currour were also working for the king at this time. William Currour was involved in organising the pageant of the Passion in Edinburgh in 1507. He made a gold heart jewel and a silver powder horn, and his wife provided a gold "chaffron" for Margaret Tudor to wear as a headdress with a "target" brooch or badge. The account specifies that both "chaffron" and "target" were for the queen's hood.
