= Eleanor Johns =

Eleanor Johns or Jones was a Welsh-born courtier of Elizabeth of York and her daughter Margaret Tudor.

She may have been a daughter of Richard Johnes, a groom of the chamber to Henry VII and Constable and Keeper of the parks of Llantrisant and Barry Island.

Her half year's wage in the household of Elizabeth of York in 1503 was £6-13s-4d. She travelled with the queen to Raglan Castle in August 1502.

Elizabeth of York died in 1503 and several members of her household became servants of her daughter, Margaret Tudor, who had been married by proxy to James IV of Scotland, including Eleanor Johns and Eleanor Verney. Margaret Tudor's marriage contract allowed her 24 English attendants, and James IV subsequently undertook to pay them "competent fees".

In Scotland she is recorded as "Mistress Eleanor" and in 1505 received the same salary as in England. Her companion "Inglis Ladyis" included Eleanor Verney and Elizabeth Berlay. As a New Year's Day gift in January 1507 she received a gold chain.

James IV paid a priest at Whithorn Priory to say Mass for "Mastres Helenor" on 26 June 1504, perhaps Eleanor Johns or Eleanor Verney.
