= Eleanor Verney =

English courtier

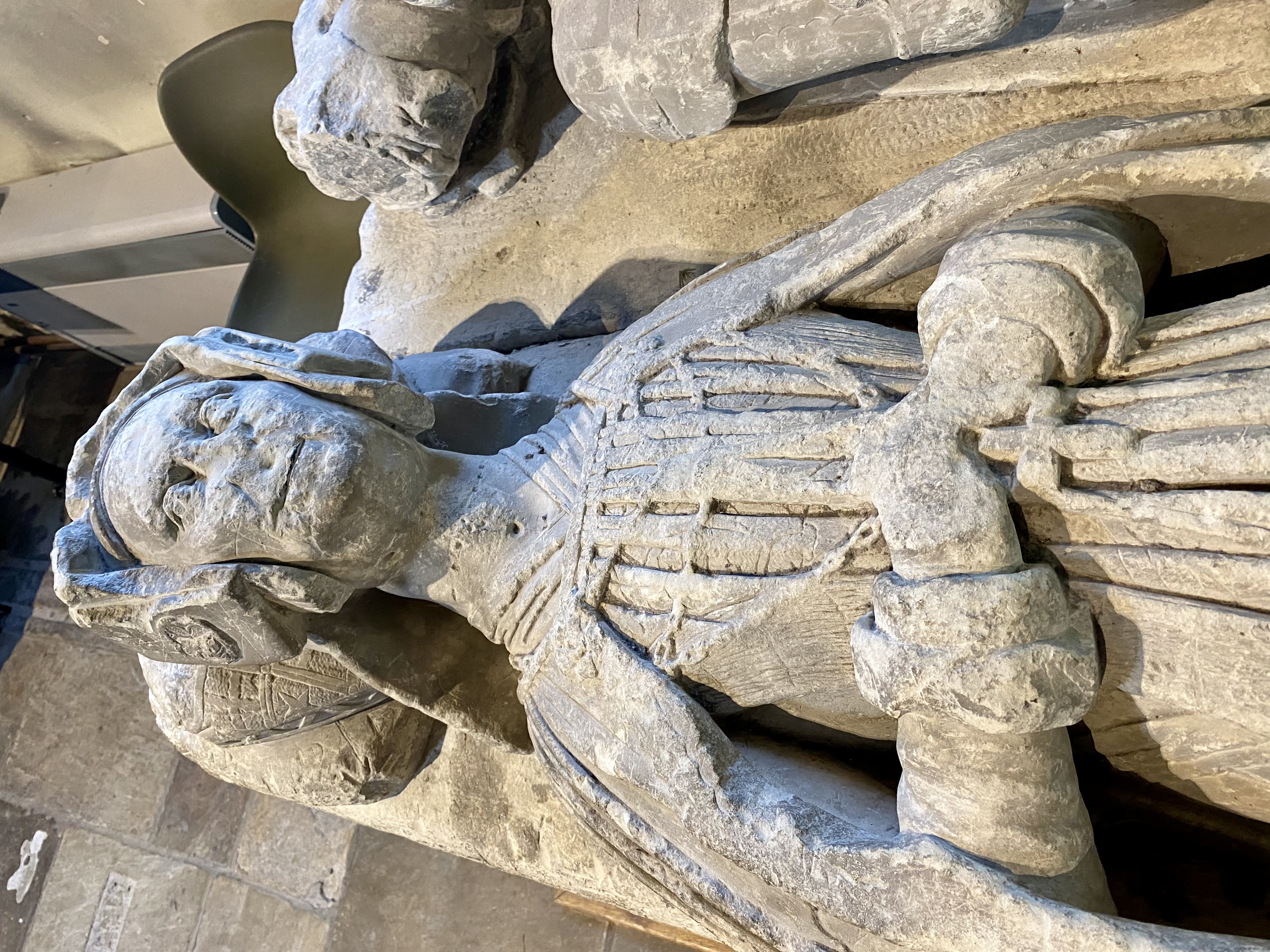
Eleanor Verney depicted on her tomb in All Saints' Church, Kings Langley

Eleanor or Alianor Verney was an English courtier who travelled to Scotland with Margaret Tudor in 1503.

== Family background ==
She was a daughter of Geoffrey Pole and Edith St John. Her brother Richard Pole married Margaret Plantagenet daughter of George, Duke of Clarence in 1487, a wedding perhaps intended to heal the divisions of the War of the Roses.

== Household of Elizabeth of York ==
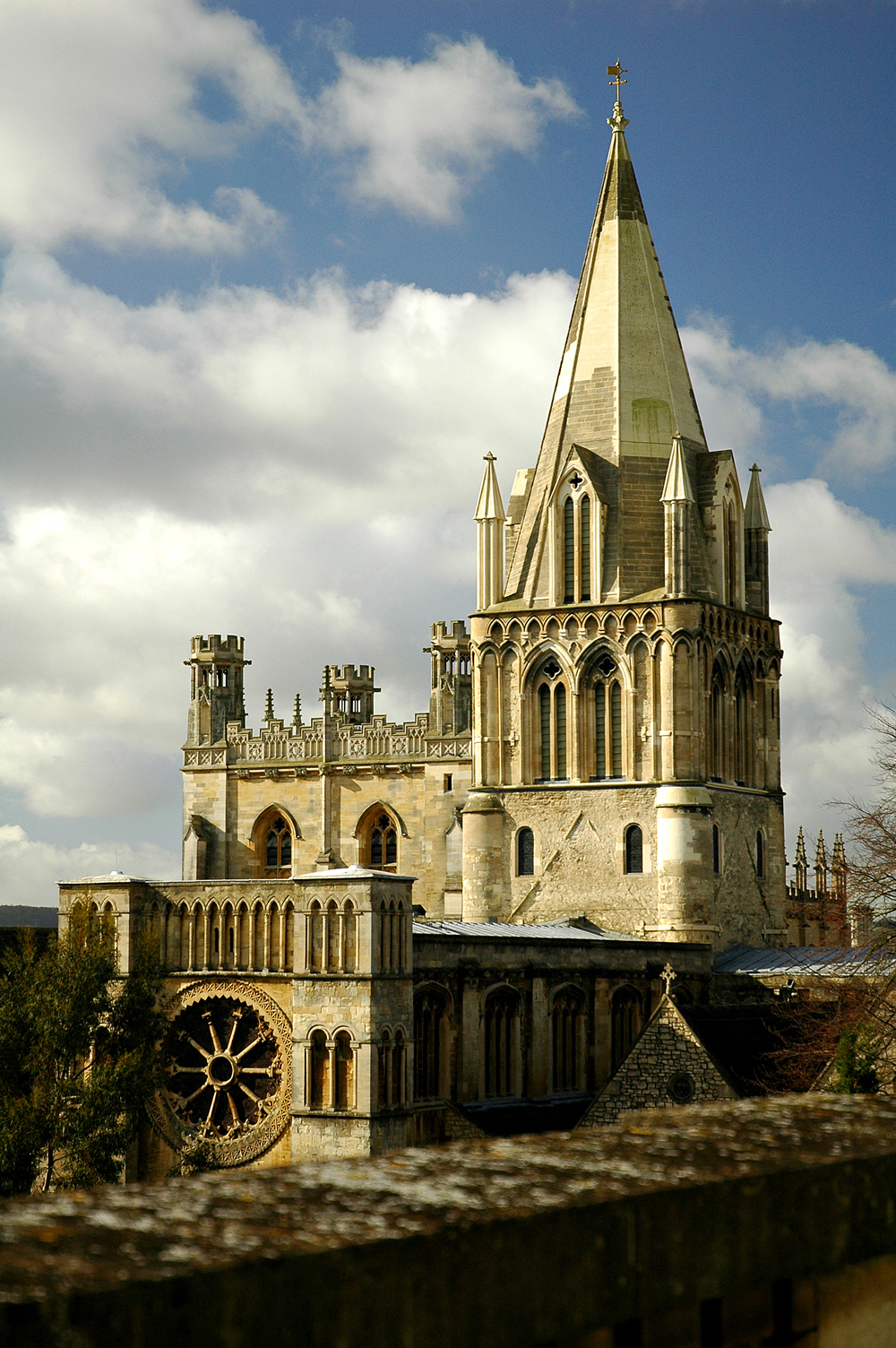
Lady Verney came from Wycombe to give Elizabeth of York's offering at the shrine of Saint Frideswide in Oxford

She married Ralph Verney, chamberlain to Elizabeth of York. Henry VII granted them the manor of Swerford in Oxfordshire. Ralph Verney was steward of the Duchy of Lancaster for Bedford and Buckingham in 1485. Cecily Neville, Duchess of York, made Verney keeper of the parks of Berkhamsted and Kings Langley in 1487. They had a son, John Verney, born in 1488. She became chief lady in waiting to Elizabeth of York, and attended her coronation at Westminster Abbey on 25 November 1487. Ralph Verney was given a black velvet doublet and gown in December 1498.

An account of the privy purse of Elizabeth of York shows that Lady Verney accompanied the queen and made payments for her. In July 1502 Lady Verney paid the ferry man at Datchet for carrying the queen across the Thames. In August, at the command of Elizabeth of York, she made an offering of 20 pence at the shrine of Saint Frideswide at Oxford. On 28 August Elizabeth of York crossed the Severn at Chepstow on her way to Thornbury and Berkeley Castle, accompanied by Lady Verney, who transferred 40 shillings to the queen's purse at "Walleston" perhaps Woolaston near Chepstow. A modern transcription of the queen's account has been compiled by the Tudor Chamber Books Project.

Lady Verney paid the painters Robert Fyll and John Reynolds for making heraldic beasts for the garden at Windsor Castle. A copy of Wynkyn de Worde's Vitas Patrum now in Lambeth Palace library was inscribed by Eleanor Verney and the nun Martha Fabyan.

"Lady Alyanor Verney" was paid a fee or pension of £20 in March 1503, as was Elizabeth Denton.

== Margaret Tudor in Scotland ==
Elizabeth of York died in 1503 and Ralph Verney assisted at her funeral, Eleanor Verney rode in the procession. Several members of Elizabeth's household became servants of her daughter, Margaret Tudor, who had been married by proxy to James IV of Scotland. Eleanor and Ralph Verney travelled to Scotland and Ralph Verney became Margaret Tudor's chamberlain. Margaret Tudor's marriage contract allowed her 24 English attendants, and James IV subsequently undertook to pay them "competent fees". Margaret Tudor wrote from Holyrood to Henry VII, thanking him for the good service of the retinue that had accompanied her to Scotland, and mentioning her hopes that Ralph Verney, as her chamberlain, would become a good advocate for her.

It has been suggested that Elen or Ellen More, an African servant at the Scottish court, was baptised and renamed after Eleanor Verney.

In January 1505, as a New Year's Day gift, James IV gave Eleanor Verney fabric for a kirtle and probably, a gown. She was also paid a fee or salary with other "Inglis Ladyeis" of Margaret's household, including Elizabeth Berlay and Eleanor Johns. In January 1507, she was given a gold chain, provided by John Currour.

Lady Verney's two maiden attendants were given 11 gold coins strung as beads on necklaces as a New Year's Day gift in 1506. Eleanor and Ralph Verney were in Haddington and Coldingham in August 1507.

== England and Mary Tudor ==
Margaret Beaufort bequeathed £20 to "dame Elenor Vernay". Eleanor and Ralph Verney returned to England by 1509 and attended the funeral of Henry VII. They both joined the household of Mary Tudor, soon to be Queen of France. In 1516 she was awarded an annual wage of £20, perhaps as a member of the household of Princess Mary. She was granted a tun of wine annually by Henry VIII in February 1517.

Ralph Verney died on 6 July 1528 and was buried at Kings Langley in Hertfordshire. There is a monument with their effigies and heraldry in All Saints' Church, Kings Langley. Eleanor Verney outlived her husband and was given an annuity by Henry VIII in April 1532.
