= Auchindoun, Moray =

Rural hamlet in Moray, Scotland

Coordinates: 57°26′47″N 3°4′31″W

Auchindoun (Scottish Gaelic: Achadh an Dùin) is a rural hamlet in Moray, Scotland.

It is located some 2.5 miles east of Dufftown, which describes itself as "The Malt Whisky Capital". The hamlet is mainly on the eastern bank of the River Fiddich. Nearby is the ruined Auchindoun Castle.

One source suggests the meaning of Achadh an Dùin to be "the field of the mound/tower."
