= Walter MacFarlane =

Walter MacFarlane or MacFarlan (died 8 June 1767) was a Scottish antiquarian and 20th chief of the Clan MacFarlane.

MacFarlane was the second son of John MacFarlan of Arrochar (d. 1705), chief of clan MacFarlane, and Helen (d. 1741), daughter of Robert, 2nd Viscount of Arbuthnott. His date of birth is uncertain: he is known to have been under twenty-one in 1709, so was certainly born after 1689, and possibly not long before the death of his father in 1705, when he succeeded as chief of Clan MacFarlane.

He was the author of a number of "collections", among them multi-volume genealogical works. His Geographical Collections relating to Scotland, a work in three volumes that collected historical, geographical, and folkloristic information dating from 1600 to 1730. MacFarlane had gathered much of the material in 1748–49; it was published posthumously by the Scottish History Society in 1906, edited by Arthur Mitchell. The work included a large number of observations recorded by Robert Sibbald, who had attempted a methodical survey of Scotland's parishes.
