= Margaret Tudor =

Queen of Scotland from 1503 to 1513

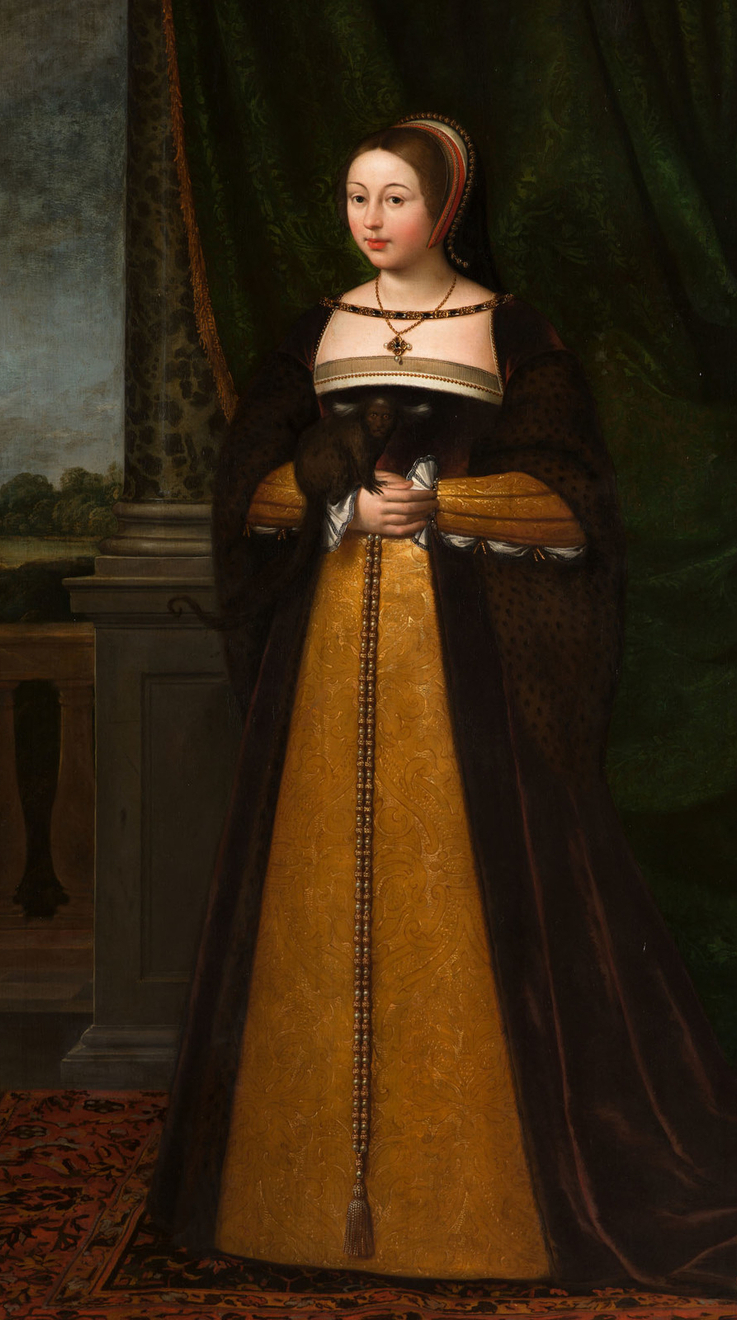
- Portrait by Daniel Mytens, c. 1620–1638

Queen consort of Scotland
- Tenure: 8 August 1503 – 9 September 1513
- Coronation: 8 August 1503

Regent of Scotland
- Regency: 1513–1515; 1524–1525
- Monarch: James V
- Born: 29 November 1489; Palace of Westminster, London, England
- Died: 18 October 1541 (aged 51); Methven Castle, Perthshire, Scotland
- Burial: Perth Charterhouse
- Spouses: James IV of Scotland (m. 1503; died 1513) Archibald Douglas, 6th Earl of Angus (m. 1514; ann. 1527) Henry Stewart, 1st Lord Methven (m. 1528)
- Issue more...: James V; Alexander Stewart, Duke of Ross; Margaret Douglas, Countess of Lennox
- House: Tudor (by birth); Stuart (by marriage)
- Father: Henry VII of England
- Mother: Elizabeth of York
- Religion: Catholicism

Margaret Tudor (29 November 1489 – 18 October 1541) was Queen of Scotland from 1503 until 1513 as the wife of James IV. She then served as regent of Scotland during her son's minority, and fought to extend her regency. Margaret was the eldest daughter of Henry VII of England and Elizabeth of York, and the elder sister of Henry VIII. Through her descendants, the House of Stuart eventually acceded to the thrones of England and Ireland, culminating in the "Union of the Crowns" under her great-grandson James VI and I in 1603 following the death of her niece Elizabeth I.

Margaret married James IV at the age of 13, in accordance with the Treaty of Perpetual Peace between England and Scotland. Together, they had six children, though only one of them reached adulthood. Margaret's marriage to James linked the royal houses of England and Scotland. Following the death of James IV at the Battle of Flodden in 1513, Margaret, as queen dowager, was appointed as regent for their son James V. A pro-French party took shape among the nobility, urging that the king's closest male relative and third in line to the Scottish throne, John Stewart, Duke of Albany, should replace Margaret as regent. In seeking allies, Margaret turned to the Douglases, and in 1514 she married Archibald Douglas, 6th Earl of Angus, with whom she had one daughter, Margaret Douglas. Margaret's marriage to the Earl of Angus alienated other powerful nobles, and by the terms of her late husband's will, also meant that she could no longer act as regent. Thus, the Duke of Albany took her place as regent. In 1524, Margaret, with the help of the Hamiltons, removed the Duke of Albany from power in a coup d'état while he was in France. She was again recognised by the Parliament of Scotland as regent, then later as chief counsellor to James V when he came of age.

In 1527, Pope Clement VII approved the annulment of Margaret's marriage to the Earl of Angus. The following year, she married Henry Stewart, whom the King created Lord Methven. Through her first and second marriages, Margaret was respectively the grandmother of Mary, Queen of Scots, and of Henry Stuart, Lord Darnley.

== Early life ==
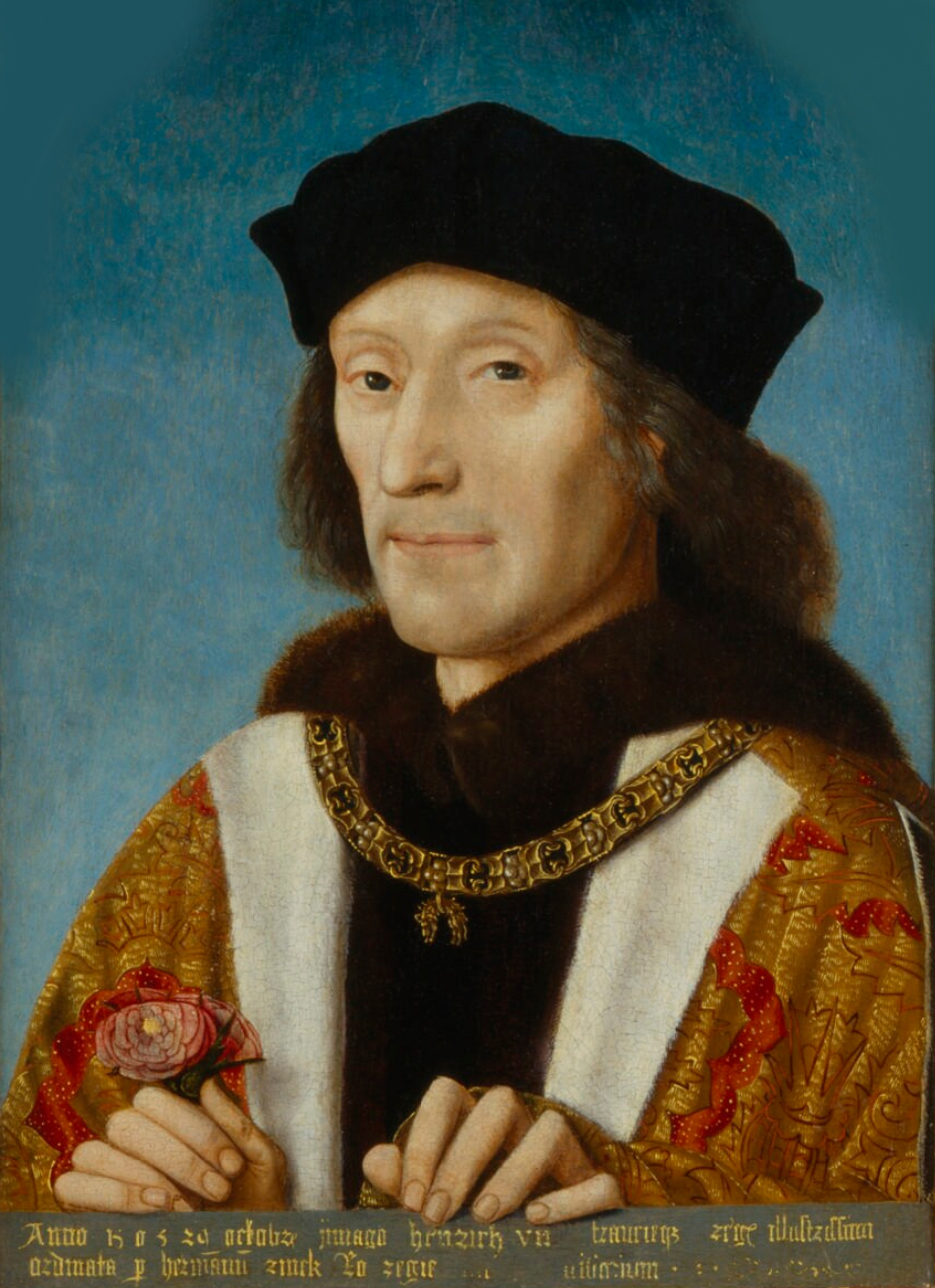
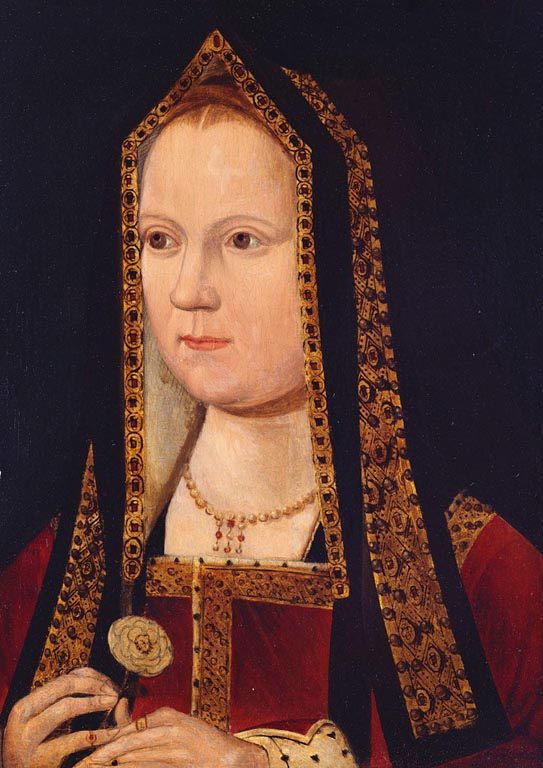
Henry VII and Elizabeth of York, Margaret's parents

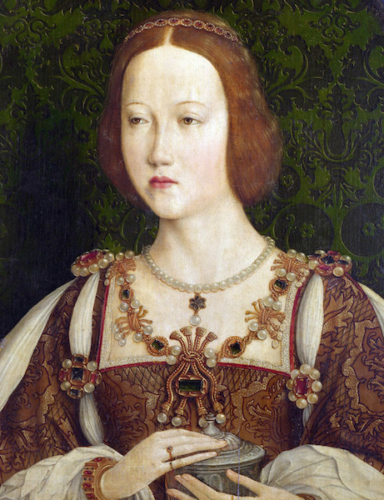
A possible portrait of Margaret or her younger sister Mary. Painted by Bernhard Strigel, circa 1520.

Margaret was born on 29 November 1489 at the Palace of Westminster in London to King Henry VII and his wife, Elizabeth of York. She was their second child and firstborn daughter. Her siblings included Arthur, Prince of Wales, the future King Henry VIII, and Mary, who would briefly become Queen of France. Margaret was baptised in St. Margaret's, Westminster on St Andrew's Day. She was named after Margaret Beaufort, Countess of Richmond and Derby, her paternal grandmother. She was placed under the supervision of the Lady mistress of the royal nursery, Elizabeth, Lady Darcy, and her nurse was Alice Davy, who later joined the household of Catherine of Aragon.

On 30 September 1497, James IV's commissioner, the Spaniard Pedro de Ayala concluded a lengthy truce with England, and the marriage with Margaret became a serious possibility. James was in his late twenties and still unmarried. Pedro de Ayala heard that both Elizabeth of York and Margaret Beaufort opposed the marriage, contending that Margaret was too young to become a mother. The Italian historian Polydore Vergil said that some of the English royal council objected to the match, saying that it would bring the Stewarts directly into the line of English succession, to which the wily and astute Henry replied:

What then? Should anything of the kind happen (and God avert the omen), I foresee that our realm would suffer no harm, since England would not be absorbed by Scotland, but rather Scotland by England, being the noblest head of the entire island, since there is always less glory and honour in being joined to that which is far the greater, just as Normandy once came under the rule and power of our ancestors the English.

On 24 January 1502, Scotland and England concluded the Treaty of Perpetual Peace, the first peace agreement between the two realms in over 170 years. The marriage treaty was concluded the same day and was viewed as a guarantee of the new peace. Margaret, who was still a child, remained in England, but was now known as the "Queen of Scots".

== Marriage and progress ==
The marriage was completed by proxy on 15 January 1503 at Richmond Palace. Henry pledged a £10,000 dowry, while James promised his bride £1,000 Scots per annum, together with lands and castles yielding a further yearly income of £6,000. The Earl of Bothwell was proxy for the Scottish king and wore a gown of cloth-of-gold at the ceremony in the Queen's great chamber. He was accompanied by Robert Blackadder, archbishop of Glasgow, and Andrew Forman, postulate of Moray. The herald, John Young, reported that "right notable jousts" followed the ceremony; prizes were awarded the next morning, and the tournament continued another day.

The new queen was provided with a large wardrobe of clothes, and her crimson state bed curtains made of Italian sarcenet were embroidered with red Lancastrian roses. Clothes were also made for her companion, Lady Catherine Gordon, the widow of Perkin Warbeck. The clothes were embroidered by John Flee. In May 1503, James IV confirmed her possession of lands and houses in Scotland, including Methven Castle, Stirling Castle, Doune Castle, Linlithgow Palace and Newark Castle in Ettrick Forest, with the incomes from the corresponding earldom and lordship lands.

Later in 1503, months after the death of her mother, Margaret left England for Scotland; her progress was a grand journey northward. She brought with her a large retinue, including, among others, Elizabeth Denton and Eleanor Verney. She left Richmond Palace on 27 June 1503 with her father Henry VII, and they travelled first to Collyweston in Northamptonshire. At York a plaque commemorates the exact spot where the Queen of Scots entered its gates. After crossing the border at Berwick upon Tweed on 1 August 1503, Margaret was met by the Scottish court at Lamberton. At Dalkeith Palace, James came to kiss her goodnight. He came again to console her on 4 August after a stable fire had killed some of her favourite horses. Her riding gear, including a new sumpter cloth or pallion of cloth-of-gold worth £127 was destroyed in the fire. At a meadow a mile from Edinburgh, there was a pavilion where Sir Patrick Hamilton and Patrick Sinclair played and fought in the guise of knights defending their ladies.

On 8 August 1503, the marriage was celebrated in person in Holyrood Abbey. The rites were performed by the Archbishop of Glasgow and Thomas Savage, Archbishop of York; Margaret was anointed during the ceremony. Two days later, on St Lawrence's day, Margaret went to mass at St Giles', the town's Kirk, as her first public appointment. The details of the proxy marriage, progress, arrival, and reception in Edinburgh were recorded by the Somerset Herald, John Young.

One English guest recorded the menu of the banquet in a copy of the Great Chronicle of London. Dishes included solan geese with sauce, baked apples and pears, and jelly moulded with the arms of England and Scotland. In the English parliament, Thomas More opposed Henry VII's plan for a tax to recover expenses for the wedding. Margaret's crown was made by an Edinburgh goldsmith, John Currour; in the days following the wedding, Currour also provided her with rings, a heart of gold, an image of the Virgin Mary, and a gold cross.

== Reign of James IV ==
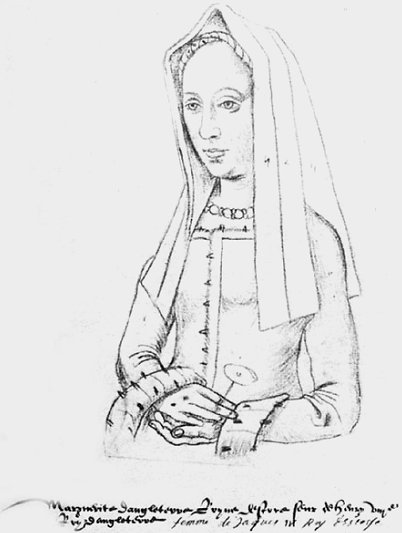
Copy of a contemporary portrait of Margaret from the Recueil d'Arras

By her marriage contract, Margaret was allowed a household with 24 English courtiers or servants. These included her cook Hunt, her chamberer Margaret, John Camner who played the lute, her ushers Hamnet Clegg and Edmund Livesay, and her ladies in waiting, Margaret Dennet, Eleanor Johns, Eleanor Verney, Agnes Musgrave, and Elizabeth Berlay. Some of her ladies in waiting had been members of the household of Elizabeth of York. Richard Justice and Harry Roper worked in the wardrobe, making her sheets, washing clothes, mending her tapestries and perfuming them with violet powder. Roper had been Page of the Beds to Elizabeth of York, and Justice was her Page of Robes. Roper returned to England to serve Catherine of Aragon. Elizabeth Maxtoun, a Scottish woman, washed the queen's linen. Rich fabrics were provided by an Italian merchant Jerome Frescobaldi. After a few years, she employed a Scottish cook Alexander Kerse. Some members of her household were described in a humorous poem by William Dunbar, Ane Dance in the Quenis Chalmer.

On Maundy Thursday, known as Skyre Thursday or "Cena Domini", it was the custom for the monarch and consort to give gifts to the poor and symbolically wash their feet. On 4 April 1504, Margaret gave 15 poor women blue gowns, shoes, a purse with 15 English pennies, and a wooden tankard with a jug and a plate, a token of the Last Supper. The number of poor women matched her age. Another custom was to give gifts on New Year's Day, and James IV gave Margaret two sapphire rings in 1504. In 1507 James IV gave her a "serpent's tongue" (really a shark tooth) set in gold with precious stones, which was believed to guard against poison. She gave a French knight Antoine d'Arces a gold salt cellar with an image of the Virgin Mary. In January 1513 the gifts included gold rings for eight ladies of her chamber, made by John Aitkin, a goldsmith who worked in Stirling Castle, and the "two black ladies" Ellen and Margaret More were given 10 gold French crowns. Margaret suffered from nosebleeds, and an apothecary William Foular provided a bloodstone or heliotrope as a remedy. Foular also sent the queen medicinal spices including pepper, cinnamon, "cubebarum", and "galiga", with glass urinals.

Margaret went on pilgrimages to Whitekirk in East Lothian, and to the shrine of Saint Adrian on the Isle of May. In July 1507, after recovering from a period of ill-health, she went to Whithorn in Galloway, dressed in green velvet and riding on a saddle covered with the pelt of a reindeer, accompanied by her ladies and the court musicians. Margaret first visited Aberdeen in 1511. The subject matter of the tableaux presented to the queen on that occasion, described by William Dunbar in his poem 'Blyth Aberdeane', suggest a growing anxiety about the absence of a male heir.

The king named the Scottish warship Margaret after her. The treaty of 1502, far from being perpetual, barely survived the death of Henry VII in 1509. His successor, the young Henry VIII, had little time for his father's cautious diplomacy, and was soon heading towards a war with France, Scotland's historic ally. In 1513, James invaded England to honour his commitment to the Auld Alliance, only to meet death and disaster at the Battle of Flodden. Margaret had opposed the war, but was still named in the royal will as regent for the infant king, James V, for as long as she remained a widow.

== Regency and second marriage ==
Parliament met at Stirling not long after Flodden, and confirmed Margaret in the office of regent. A woman was rarely welcome in a position of supreme power, and Margaret was the sister of an enemy king, which served to compound her problems. Before long a pro-French party took shape among the nobility, urging that she should be replaced by John Stewart, Duke of Albany, the closest male relative to the infant prince, and now third in line to the throne.

Albany, who had been born and raised in France, was seen as a living representative of the Auld Alliance, in contrast with the pro-English Margaret. She is considered to have acted calmly and with some degree of political skill. By July 1514, she had managed to reconcile the contending parties, and Scotland — along with France — concluded peace with England that same month. But in her search for political allies among the fractious Scottish nobility she took a fatal step, allowing good sense and prudence to be overruled by emotion and the personal magnetism of Archibald Douglas, 6th Earl of Angus.

Margaret's coat of arms as Queen consort of Scotland

In seeking allies Margaret turned more and more to the powerful House of Douglas. She found herself particularly attracted to the Earl of Angus, whom even his uncle, the cleric and poet Gavin Douglas, called a "young witless fool". Margaret and Douglas were secretly married in the parish church of Kinnoull, near Perth, on 6 August 1514. Not only did this alienate the other noble houses but it immediately strengthened the pro-French faction on the council, headed by James Beaton, Archbishop of Glasgow. By the terms of the late king's will she had sacrificed her position as Regent of Scotland, and before the month was out, she was obliged to consent to the appointment of Albany.

In September, the Privy Council decided that she had also forfeited her rights to the supervision of her sons, whereupon in defiance she and her allies took the princes to Stirling Castle. In November, Margaret devised a code for letters sent to Henry VIII, saying that those signed "Your loving sister, Margaret R" would be genuine, and others might be the result of coercion by her enemies.

== Escape to England and birth of last child ==
Albany arrived in Scotland in May 1515, and was finally installed as regent in July. The Scots, believing that a man of his eminence was needed to keep order in the country against England, persuaded the French to allow the duke to cross to Scotland; he landed in Dumbarton on 18 May 1515 with eight ships bearing supplies and French soldiers. His first task was to get custody of James and Alexander, politically essential for the authority of the regency. Margaret, after some initial defiance, surrendered at Stirling in August. With the princes in the hands of their uncle, Margaret, now expecting a child by Angus, retired to Edinburgh. For some time her brother had been urging her to flee to England with her sons; but she had steadily refused to do so, fearing such a step might lead to James's loss of the Scottish crown.

However, once Margaret's two sons were in the custody of their uncle, Margaret secretly accepted her brother's offer of her personal safety at the English Court. Pregnant with Angus' child, Margaret feared for her life under the rule of the Privy Council of Scotland. As queen dowager she was forced to beg permission from the Privy Council even to travel. She obtained permission to go to Linlithgow Palace for her lying-in.

She escaped to Tantallon Castle and then, via Blackadder Castle and Coldstream Priory, crossed the border to England. She left valuable costume and jewels behind at Tantallon, including several velvet hoods embroidered with pearls with jewel-set front borders called "chaffrons", and a silk hat with a diamond jewel that had been a present from Louis XII of France. Her jewels were later collected by Thomas Dacre's agent, John Whelpdale, the Master of College of Greystoke.

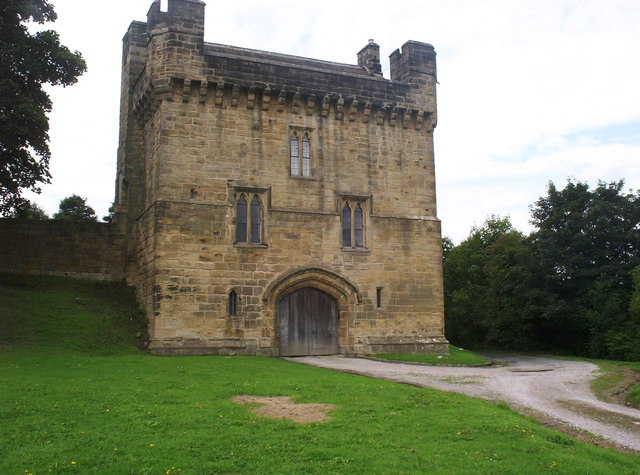
Morpeth Castle Gatehouse

Margaret was received by Thomas Dacre, Henry's Warden of the Marches, and taken to Harbottle Castle in Northumberland. Here in early October she gave birth to Lady Margaret Douglas, the future Countess of Lennox and mother of Henry Stuart, Lord Darnley, cousin and second husband to Mary, Queen of Scots, and father of the future James VI. Margaret was in significant pain after the birth and may have been suffering from sciatica. By 21 November she had travelled the 5 miles to Brinkburn Priory, but it was the end of the month before Dacre received her at Morpeth Castle. During the queen's stay there, Dacre and Thomas Magnus persuaded her to sign a memorandum of complaint about her treatment by Albany. On 18 December, while she lay seriously ill at Morpeth, Margaret's second son, Alexander, died.

While still in the north of England, Queen Margaret learned of the death of her younger son, Alexander. Dacre hinted that Albany – cast in the role of Richard III – was responsible. Margaret, even in her vulnerable state, refused to accept this, saying that if he really aimed at securing the throne for himself the death of James would have suited his purpose better. It was also at this time that she at last began to get the measure of Angus, who, with an eye on his own welfare, returned to Scotland to make peace with the Regent, "which much made Margaret to muse". When Henry VIII learned that Angus would not be accompanying his sister to London he said, "Done like a Scot". However, all of Angus's power, wealth and influence was in Scotland; to abandon the country would mean possible forfeiture for treason. In this regard he would have had before him the example of his kinsman James Douglas, 9th Earl of Douglas, who had fled to England the previous century, living out his life as a landless mercenary.

== Politics and decline of second marriage ==
Margaret was well received by Henry and, to confirm her status, was lodged in Scotland Yard, the ancient London residence of the Scottish kings, and at Baynard's Castle. In May 1517, Henry VIII held a tournament in her honour, and having spent a year in England, she returned north, after a treaty of reconciliation had been worked out by Albany, Henry and Cardinal Wolsey. Albany was temporarily absent in France – where he renewed the Auld Alliance once more and arranged for the future marriage of James V — but the queen dowager was received at the border on 15 June by Sieur de la Bastie, Albany's deputy, as well as by her husband.

Although Margaret and Angus were temporarily reconciled, it was not long before their relationship entered a phase of terminal decline. She discovered that while she was in England her husband had been living with Lady Jane Stewart, a former lover. This was bad enough; what was worse, he had been living on his wife's money. In October 1518, she wrote to her brother, hinting at divorce:

"I am sore troubled with my Lord of Angus since my last coming into Scotland, and every day more and more, so that we have not been together this half year ... I am so minded that, and I may by law of God and to my honour, to part with him, for I wit well he loves me not, as he shows to me daily."

This was a difficult issue for Henry; a man of conservative and orthodox belief, he was opposed to divorce on principle – which was highly ironic, considering his later marital career. Just as important, Angus was a useful ally and an effective counter-weight to Albany and the pro-French faction. Angered by his attitude, Margaret drew closer to the Albany faction and joined others in calling for his return from France. Albany, seemingly in no hurry to return to the fractious northern kingdom, suggested that she resume the regency herself. The dispute between husband and wife was set to dominate Scottish politics for the next three years, complicated even more by a bitter feud between Angus and James Hamilton, 1st Earl of Arran; with bewildering rapidity Margaret sided with one and then the other.

Albany finally arrived back in Scotland in November 1521 and Margaret established cordial relations with him. From exile in England, Gavin Douglas, the Bishop of Dunkeld, spread scurrilous rumours that their relationship embraced more than politics. Angus went into exile while the Regent – with the full cooperation of the queen dowager – set about restoring order to a country riven by three years of intense factional conflict. Albany was useful to Margaret: he was known to have influence in Rome, which would help ease her application for a divorce. Angus and his allies spread the rumour that the two were lovers, and Lord Dacre wrote to Wolsey predicting that James would be murdered and Albany would become king and marry Margaret. But there is no evidence that the relationship between the two was ever more than one of calculated self-interest.

== Margaret's coup ==
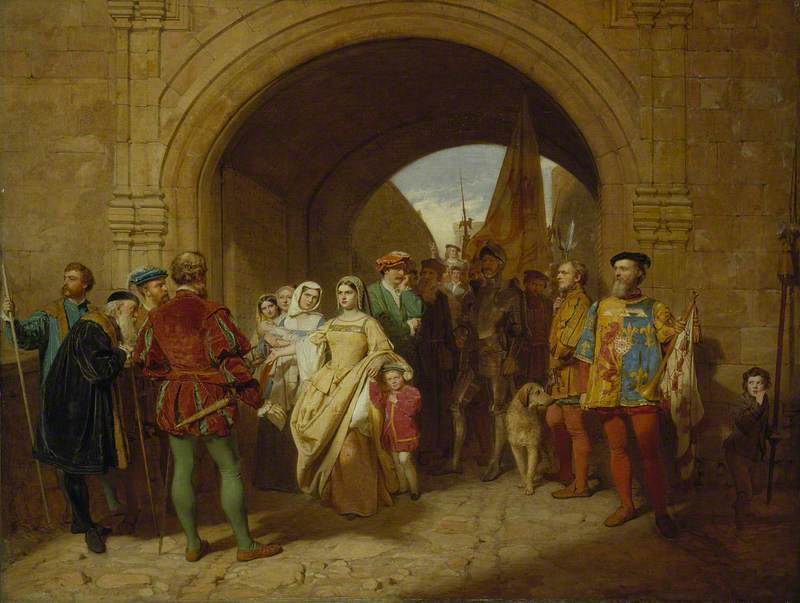
Painting of Margaret, refusing to hand over custody of her sons to John Stewart, Duke of Albany, by John Faed, 1859.

In most essentials, Margaret remained an Englishwoman in attitude and outlook, and sought a better understanding between the land of her birth and her adopted home. Necessity demanded an alliance with Albany and the French faction, especially after the devastating border wars with England in the early 1520s.

But no sooner was Albany off the scene than she set about organising a party of her own. In 1524, the Regent was finally removed from power in a simple but effective coup d'état. Albany wished that James would be kept at Stirling Castle. When he returned to France (where he was to die in 1536), Margaret, with the help of Arran and the Hamiltons, brought James, now 12 years old, from Stirling to Edinburgh.

In August, Parliament declared the regency at an end, and James was elevated to full kingly powers. In practice, he would continue to be governed by others, his mother above all. When Beaton objected to the new arrangements, Margaret had him arrested and thrown into jail. In November, Parliament formally recognised Margaret as the chief councillor to the King.

Margaret's alliance inevitably alienated other noble houses. Her situation was not eased when her brother, Henry VIII, allowed Angus to return to Scotland. Both of these factors were to some degree beyond her control. The most damaging move of all was not. She formed a new attachment, this time to Henry Stewart, a younger brother of Lord Avondale.

Stewart was promoted to senior office, angering the Earl of Lennox, among others, who promptly allied with her estranged husband. That same November, when Parliament confirmed Margaret's political office, her war with Angus descended into a murderous farce. When he arrived in Edinburgh with a large group of armed men, claiming his right to attend Parliament, she ordered cannons to be fired on him from both the Castle and Holyrood House. When the two English ambassadors present at court, Thomas Magnus and Roger Radclyff, objected that she should not attack her lawful husband she responded in anger, telling them to "go home and not meddle with Scottish matters".

Angus withdrew for the time being, but under pressure from various sources, the Queen finally admitted him to the council of regency in February 1525. It was all the leverage he needed. Taking custody of James, he refused to give him up, exercising full power on his behalf for a period of three years. James' experience during this time left him with an abiding hatred of the house of Douglas.

== Divorce and remarriage ==
Margaret attempted to resist but was forced to bend to the new political realities. Besides, by this time her desire for a divorce had become obsessive, taking precedence over all other matters. She was prepared to use all arguments, including the widespread myth that James IV had not been killed at Flodden. Despite the coup of 1524, she corresponded warmly with Albany, who continued his efforts on her behalf in Rome. In March 1527, Pope Clement VII granted her petition. Because of the political situation in Europe at the time it was not until December that she learned of her good fortune. She married Henry Stewart on 3 March 1528, ignoring the pious warnings of Cardinal Wolsey that marriage was "divinely ordained" and his protests against the "shameless sentence sent from Rome".

In June 1528, James V finally freed himself from the tutelage of Angus – who once more fled into exile – and began to rule in his own right. Margaret was an early beneficiary of the royal coup, as she and her husband emerged as the leading advisors to the king. James created Stewart Lord Methven "for the great love he bore to his dearest mother". It was rumoured – falsely – that the Queen favoured a marriage between her son and her niece Mary Tudor. She was instrumental in bringing about the Anglo-Scottish peace agreement of May 1534.

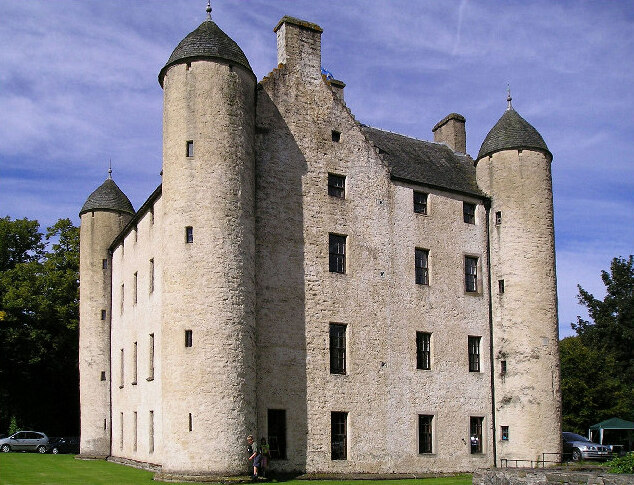
Methven Castle

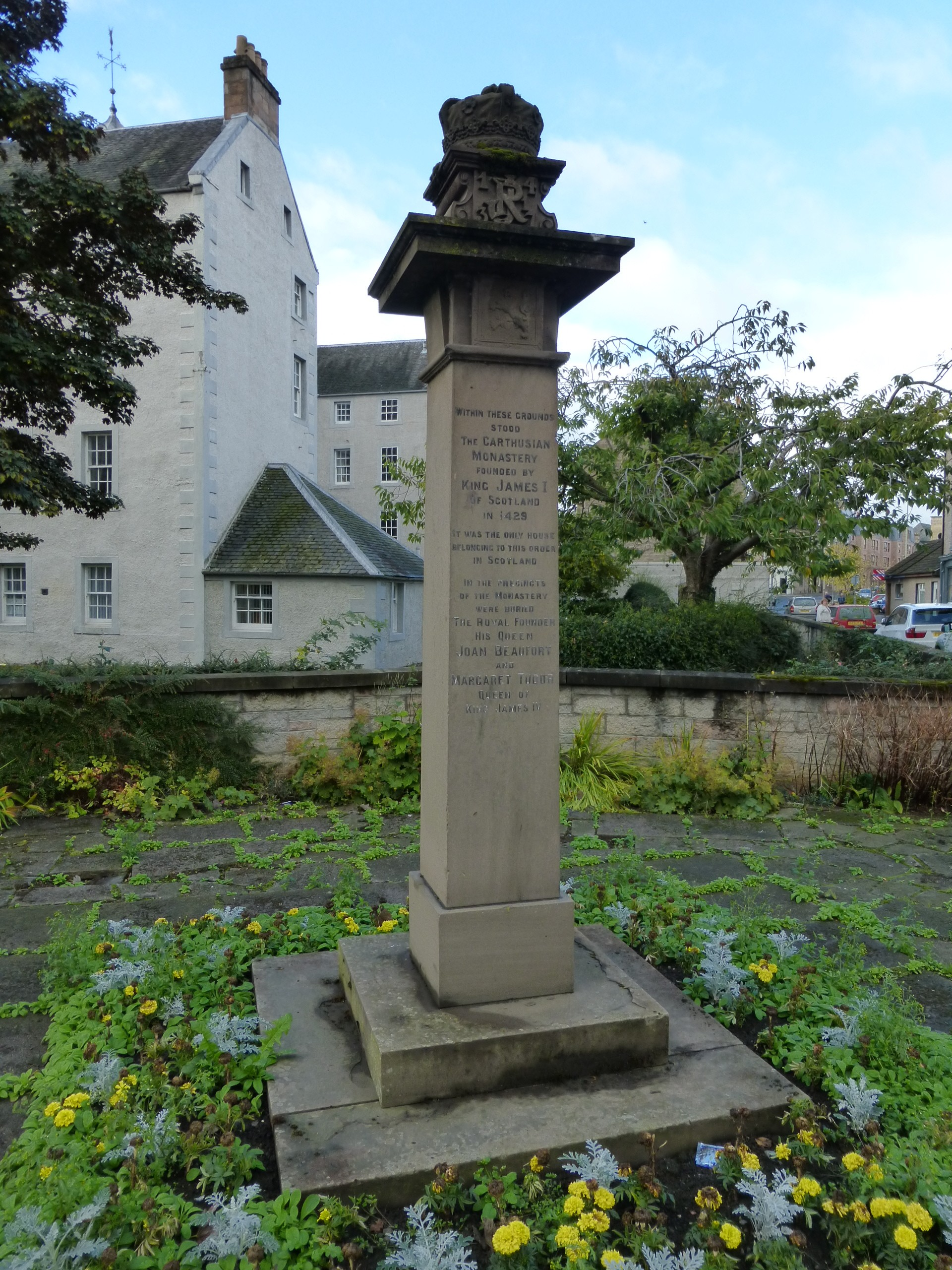
A monument now marks the site of the Perth Charterhouse

The central aim of Margaret's political life – besides assuring her own survival – was to bring about a better understanding between England and Scotland, a position she held to through some difficult times. James was suspicious of Henry, especially because of his continuing support for Angus, a man he loathed with a passion. Even so, in early 1536 his mother persuaded him to meet with her brother. It was her moment of triumph and she wrote to Henry and Thomas Cromwell, now his chief advisor, saying that it was "by advice of us and no other living person". She was looking for a grand occasion on the lines of the Field of Cloth of Gold, and spent a huge sum in preparation. In the end it came to nothing because there were too many voices raised in objection and because James would not be managed by his mother or anyone else. In a private interview with the English ambassador, William Howard, her disappointment was obvious – "I am weary of Scotland", she confessed. Her weariness even extended to betraying state secrets to Henry.

Lord Methven proved himself to be even worse than Angus in his desire both for other women and for his wife's money. Margaret was once again eager for divorce but proceedings were frustrated by James, whom she believed her husband had bribed. At one point she ran away toward the border, only to be intercepted and brought back to Edinburgh. Time and again she wrote to Henry with complaints about her poverty and appeals for money and protection. In the first months of 1536, Henry VIII sent her £200 and a parcel of luxury fabrics including lengths of purple cloth, tawny cloth of gold tissue, russet tinsel, satin, and velvet. The fabric was for the costume to wear to welcome her son's bride Madeleine of Valois.

In July 1537, Ralph Sadler brought her £200. Queen Madeleine died on 7 July. In October, Margaret wrote that she wished for ease and comfort at the "age of forty years and nine" instead of being obliged "to follow her son about like a poor gentlewoman". Margaret asked Henry VIII to send money and silver plate to help welcome her widowed son's new bride Mary of Guise to Scotland in June 1538. The two women established a good understanding. Mary made sure that her mother-in-law, who had now been reconciled with Methven, made regular appearances at court and it was reported to Henry that "the young queen was all papist, and the old queen not much less."

Accounts mention a companion of the "old queen", Margaret Hamilton, who received a gift of 22 shillings in March 1540. In the spring and summer of 1541, Margaret spent time with James V and Mary of Guise at Stirling Castle, providing support after the death of their infant sons.

== Death ==
Margaret died at Methven Castle on 18 October 1541, aged 51. Henry Ray, the Berwick Pursuivant, reported that she had palsy (possibly resulting from a stroke) on Friday and died on the following Tuesday. As she thought she would recover she did not trouble to make a will. She sent for King James, who was at Falkland Palace, but he did not come in time. Near the end she wished that the friars who attended her would seek the reconciliation of the King and the Earl of Angus. She hoped the King would give her possessions to her daughter, Lady Margaret Douglas. James arrived after her death, and he ordered Oliver Sinclair and John Tennent to pack up her belongings for his use. As a dowager queen, Margaret had received the rental money of the crown lands of Stirlingshire. After her death, this money was added to the king's income.

Margaret was buried at the Charterhouse in Perth (demolished during the Reformation, 1559, its site now occupied by the former King James VI Hospital). The funeral ceremony itself was possibly not as elaborate as that held in Edinburgh for Madeleine of Valois in 1537, but James V and his household were provided with expensive black clothes for a mourning period.

== Gallery ==
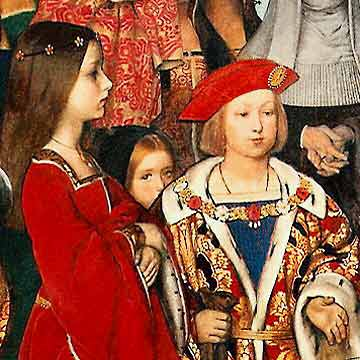
Detail of Margaret, Henry VIII, and Princess Mary being visited by Erasmus, dated c. 1910, by Frank Cadogan Cowper

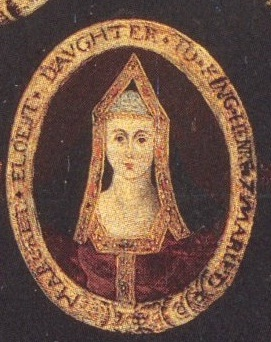
A depiction of Margaret from a family tree from the reign of her great-grandson, James VI/I of Scotland and England

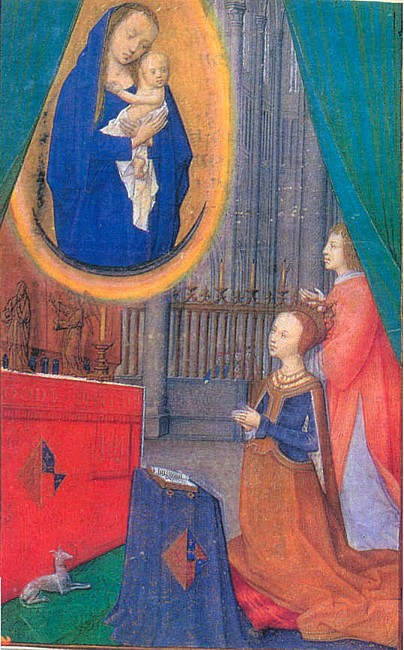
Margaret Tudor praying in coronation robes, 16th century, probably by Gerard Horenbout

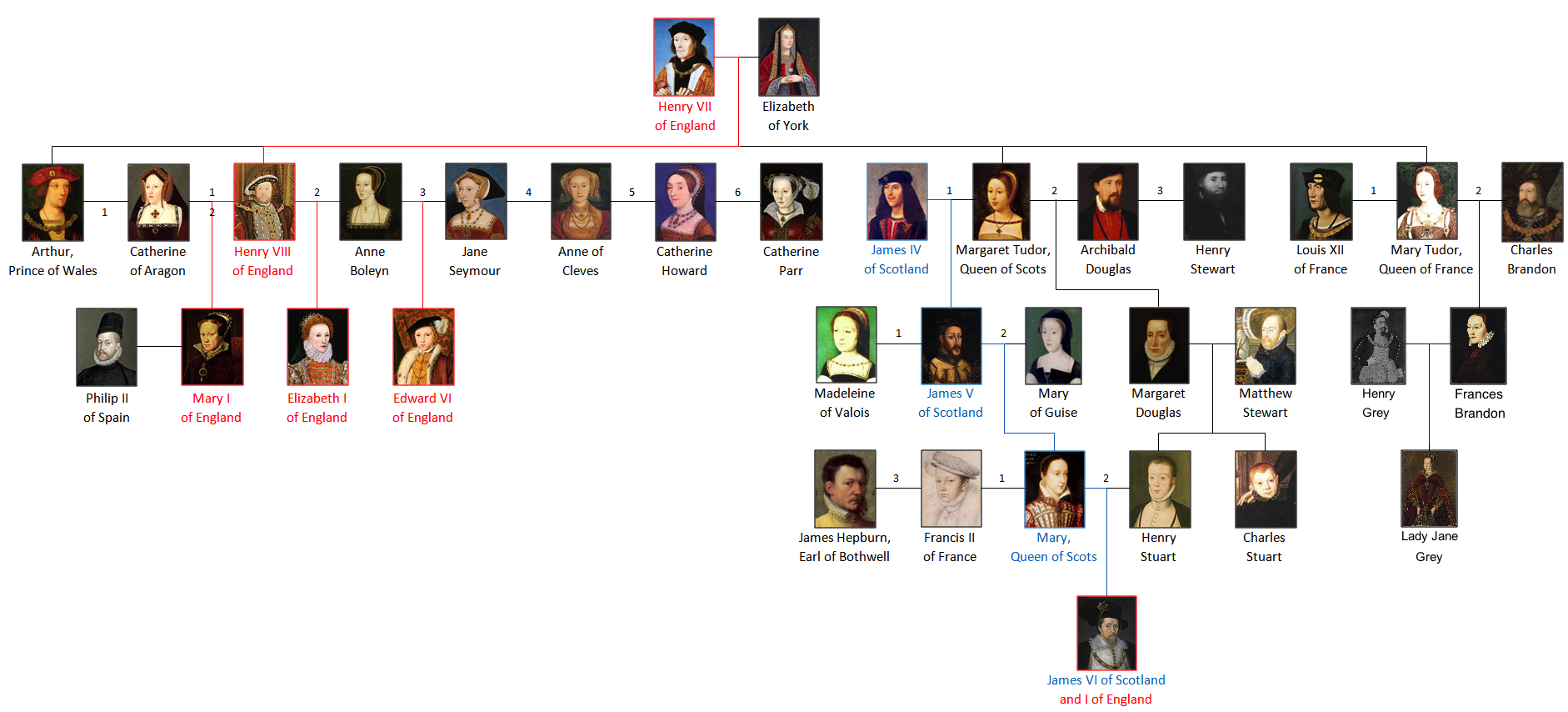
At the right Margaret Tudor with her three husbands on the Tudor family tree

== Issue ==
In 1503, Margaret married King James IV of Scotland. They had six children, of whom only one (James V) survived infancy:

- James, Duke of Rothesay (21 February 1507, Holyrood Palace – 27 February 1508, Stirling Castle).
- Daughter (died shortly after birth 15 July 1508, Holyrood Palace).
- Arthur Stewart, Duke of Rothesay (20 October 1509, Holyrood Palace – 14 July 1510, Edinburgh Castle).
- James V, born 10 April 1512 at Linlithgow Palace, who died 14 December 1542 at Falkland Palace.
- A son, who was born prematurely and died shortly after birth, November 1512, Holyrood Palace.
- Alexander Stewart, Duke of Ross (30 April 1514, Stirling Castle – 18 December 1515, Stirling Castle).

In 1514, Margaret married Archibald Douglas, 6th Earl of Angus, and had one child:

- Margaret Douglas (1515–1578), who married Matthew Stewart, 4th Earl of Lennox, regent of Scotland from 1570 to 1571.

In 1528, Margaret married Henry Stewart, 1st Lord Methven. They had no issue.

== Ancestry ==
Ancestors of Margaret Tudor

8. Sir Owen Tudor
4. Edmund Tudor, 1st Earl of Richmond
9. Catherine of Valois
2. Henry VII of England
10. John Beaufort, 1st Duke of Somerset
5. Margaret Beaufort
11. Margaret Beauchamp
1. Margaret Tudor
12. Richard Plantagenet, 3rd Duke of York
6. Edward IV of England
13. Cecily Neville
3. Elizabeth of York
14. Richard Woodville, 1st Earl Rivers
7. Elizabeth Woodville
15. Jacquetta of Luxembourg

== Sources ==
=== Works cited ===
- Bain, Joseph (1888). Calendar of Documents Relating to Scotland, Vol. 4: Preserved in Her Majesty's Public Record Office, London; A.D. 1357–1509. HM Register House. pp. 419–425. OL 20051573M.
- Beer, Michelle (2018). Queenship at the Renaissance Courts of Britain. Woodbridge.
- Buchanan, Patricia Hill (1985). Margaret Tudor, Queen of Scots. Scottish Academic Press. ISBN 978-0-7073-0424-3. OL 2752413M.
- Emond, Ken (2019). Minority of James V. John Donald. ISBN 978-1-9109-0031-4.
- Hearne, Thomas (1774). Joannis Lelandi Antiquarii de Rebus Britannicis Collectanea, 4. Benjamin White. pp. 258–300. At Internet Archive
- Macdougall, Norman (2006). James the Fourth (3rd ed.). ISBN 978-1-906566-90-6. OL 28575176M.
- Newsome-Chandler, Helen (2025). The Holograph Letters of Margaret Tudor, Queen of Scots, 1489–1541. Cambridge: Camden Society. doi:10.1017/S0960116325000065.
- Perry, Maria (2000). The Sisters of Henry VIII: The Tumultuous Lives of Margaret of Scotland and Mary of France. Perseus Books Group. ISBN 978-0-3068-0989-7. OL 9547837M.
- Strickland, Agnes (1855). Lives of the queens of Scotland and English princesses connected with the regal succession of Great Britain. Harper & brothers. pp. 151ff. OCLC 10542995. OL 6950278M.
- Tasioulas, Jacqueline (2010). The Makars. Canongate Books. pp. 4ff. ISBN 978-1-8476-7501-9.

=== Further reading ===
- Chapman, Hester (1969). The Thistle and the Rose: The Sisters of Henry VIII. Coward, McCann & Geoghegan. OL 43073265M.
- Fradenburg, Louise O. (1998). "Troubled Times: Margaret Tudor and the Historians". In Mapstone, Sally; Wood, Juliette (eds.). The Rose and the Thistle: Essays on the Culture of Late Medieval and Renaissance Scotland. Tuckwell. ISBN 978-1-898410-57-7. OL 8728349M.
- Glenne, Michael (1952). King Harry's sister, Margaret Tudor, Queen of Scotland. J. Long. OL 17355405M.
- Harvey, Nancy Lenz (1975). The rose and the thorn: the lives of Mary and Margaret Tudor. Macmillan. ISBN 978-0-02-548550-1. OL 5199300M.
- Jansen, S. (2002). The Monstrous Regiment of Women: Female Rulers in Early Modern Europe. Palgrave Macmillan US. ISBN 978-0-230-60211-3. OL 37099689M.
- Mackie, J. D. (1994). The Earlier Tudors: 1485–1558. Oxford University Press. ISBN 0-19-285292-2.
- Mackie, R. L. (1958). King James IV of Scotland.
- Nairne, Charles Richard Routh; Holmes, Peter (2001). Who's who in Tudor England. Stackpole Books. ISBN 978-0-8117-1639-0. OL 8000700M.
- Newsome, Helen, '"[An] old battle constantly re-fought": A Case Study Of the Holograph Letters of Margaret Tudor', Women's Writing, 30:4 (2023). doi:10.1080/09699082.2023.2266040
- Plowden, Alison (2011). Tudor Women: Queens & Commoners. History Press. ISBN 978-0-7524-6716-0. OL 29120191M.
- Porter, Linda (2024). The Thistle and the Rose: The Extraordinary Life of Margaret Tudor. Head of Zeus. ISBN 978-1-80110-578-1.
- Simpson, Grant G.; Galbraith, James D. (1881). Calendar of Documents Relating to Scotland: 1357–1509, addenda 1221–1435. H.M. General Register House.

Margaret Tudor House of Tudor Born: 28 November 1489 Died: 18 October 1541
Scottish royalty
Vacant Title last held by Margaret of Denmark	Queen consort of Scotland; 8 August 1503 – 9 September 1513	Vacant Title next held by Madeleine of France
