= Knockando, Moray =

Village in Moray, Scotland

Coordinates: 57°27′33″N 3°21′00″W

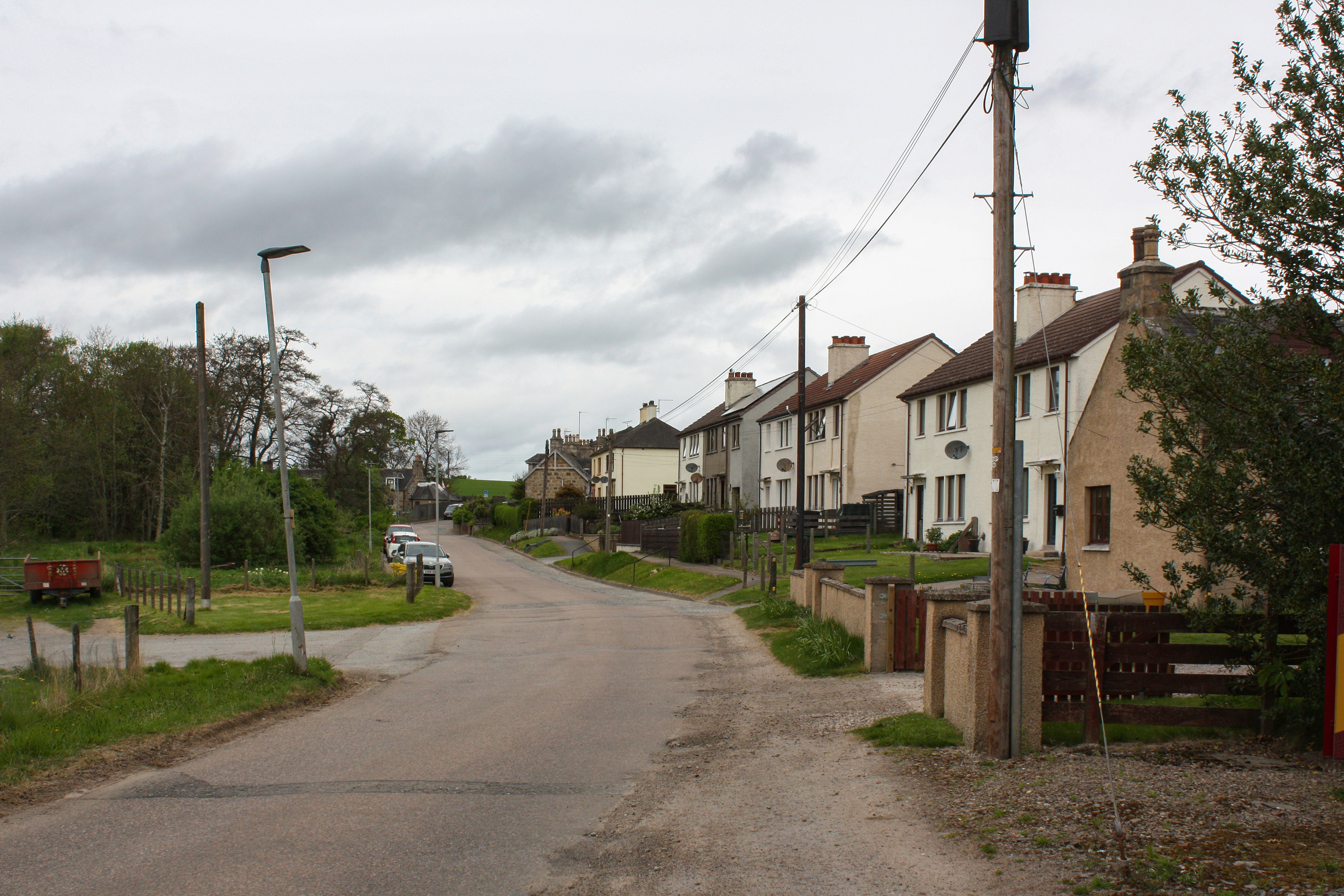
Knockando, Moray

Knockando (Scottish Gaelic: Cnoc Cheannachd) is a village in Moray, Scotland. It is a farming centre and the location of both the Knockando distillery and the Tamdhu distillery.

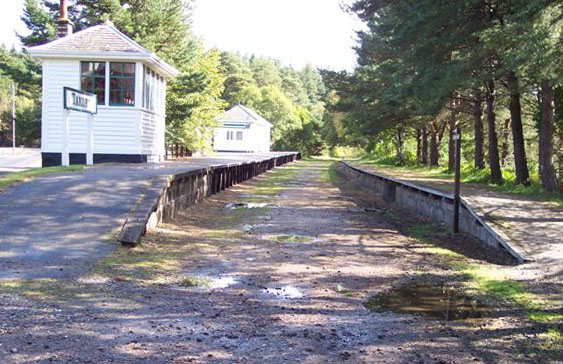
Knockando train station

It is also the location of Knockando Woolmill, which has been producing textiles since 1784 and which achieved national fame as a finalist in the second series of the BBC's Restoration television series in 2004.

== Notable people ==
- John Mackenzie (1835–1899), missionary to South Africa, born in Knockando parish
- James William Grant FRSE (1788–1865), astronomer

Sir Archibald Levin Smith is buried in Knockando churchyard having died of a broken heart two months after his wife drowned nearby in the River Spey.

== See also ==
- Knockando distillery, located in Knockando
- Dalbeallie railway station, on the former Strathspey Railway (GNoSR) line
