= Knockando Woolmill =

Historic mill in Moray, Scotland

Coordinates: 57°27′58″N 3°21′20″W

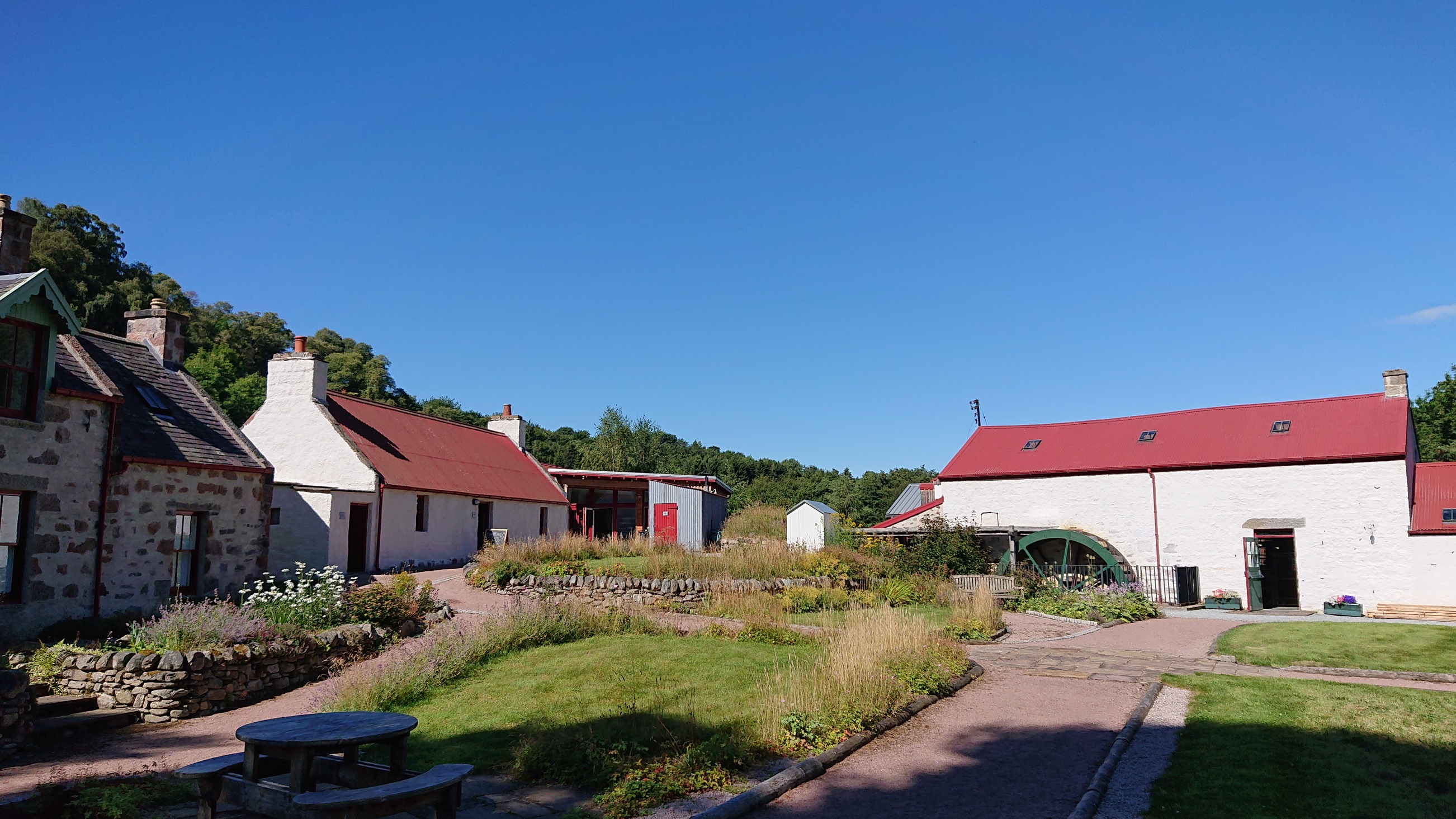
- Interactive map of the Knockando Woolmill area

General information
- Type: Wool mill
- Classification: Category A listed building
- Location: Knockando, Moray, Scotland

The Knockando Woolmill is a historic woolmill in Moray, Scotland. Wool production has taken place at the site since at least the eighteenth century, and the surviving buildings house a number of pieces of historic machinery which are still in operation. It was designated a Category A listed building in 1995, still operates as a working mill, and is open to the public from April to September.

== Description ==
The overall site comprises several buildings, all dating to the nineteenth or early twentieth centuries. The mill itself was originally a single-storey rectangular building, but the addition of a two-storey carding and spinning mill led to its current L-plan design. Both parts of the building are rubble-built with corrugated iron roofs, and there is a large weatherboarded lean-to extension, also with a corrugated iron roof, added in the late nineteenth century to house equipment. This building contains a number of pieces of historic machinery, including two Victorian looms, made by Hutchinson, Hollingworth & Co., which are thought to be the oldest looms still to be in use.

There are two dwellings on the site. The mill house, where the miller's family would have lived, was built around 1910. Rubble-built, with two storeys, it features an elegant staircase with cast iron balusters, indicative of the relative wealth of the owner. There is also a cottage, the oldest remaining building on the site, dating from the early nineteenth century. Harled, with a corrugated iron roof, it has an adjoining square-plan dairy and, diagonally opposite, a winter drying shed.

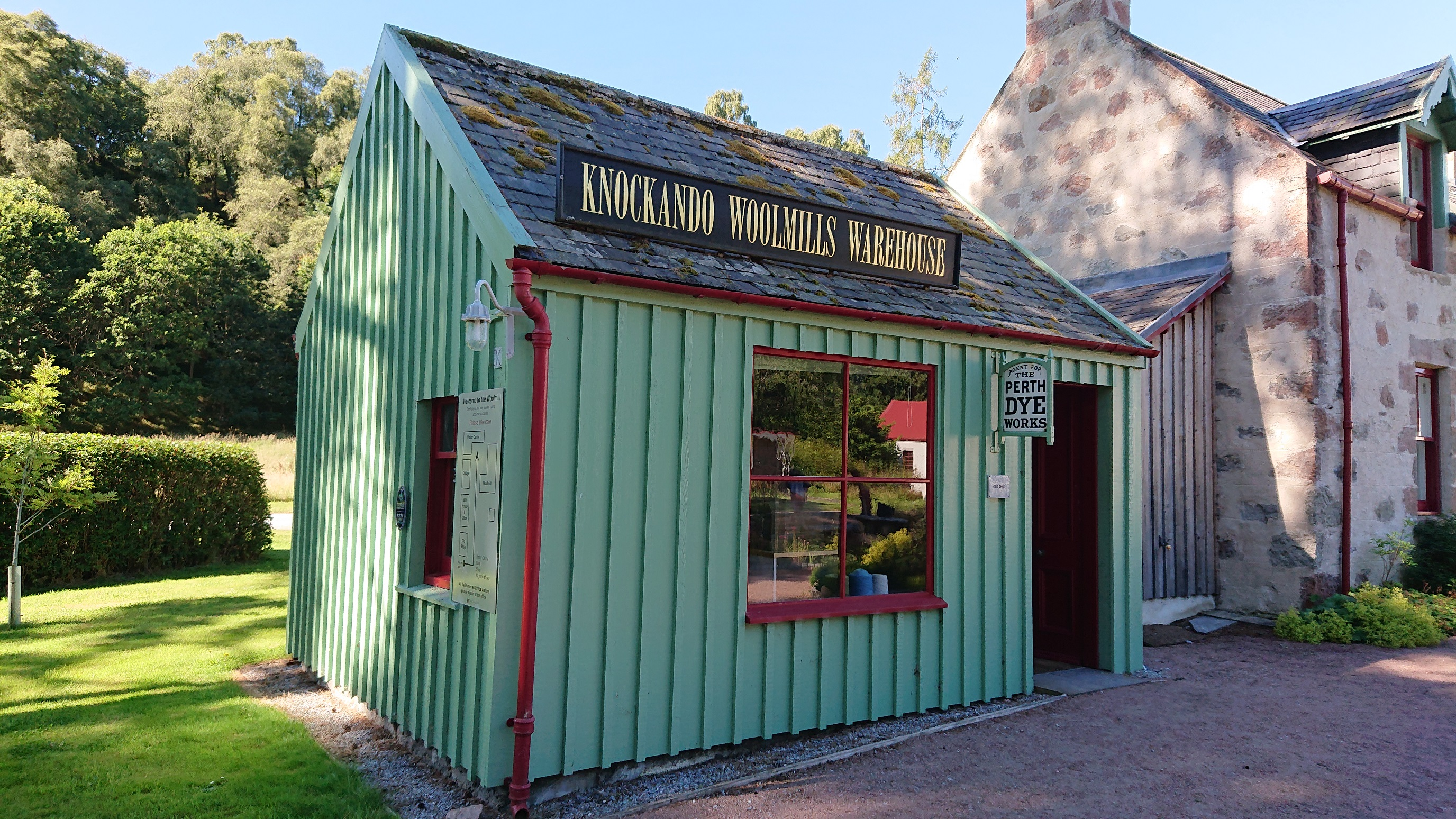
The old shop at the Knockando Woolmill

There is a shop, built for that purpose in the late nineteenth century and still used as such. It is a single-storey square-plan rubble-built structure, to the south-east of the main mill. The building currently used as a visitor centre was originally a byre. Built in the late nineteenth-century, it is a simple, rectangular building, with plain weatherboarding and a corrugated iron roof. An early twentieth-century sawmill is attached at the west gable, and a modern extension is attached to the north wall.

== History ==
Wool production has taken place at the Knockando site since at least the eighteenth century. William Roy's map of Scotland, dated 1749, depicts buildings at the site, and records from 1784 make reference to a waulk mill, operated by the Grant family at Knockando. The Grants and their mill are mentioned again in the 1851 census, which also records the presence of a wool carder, a spinner and a weaver on the site.

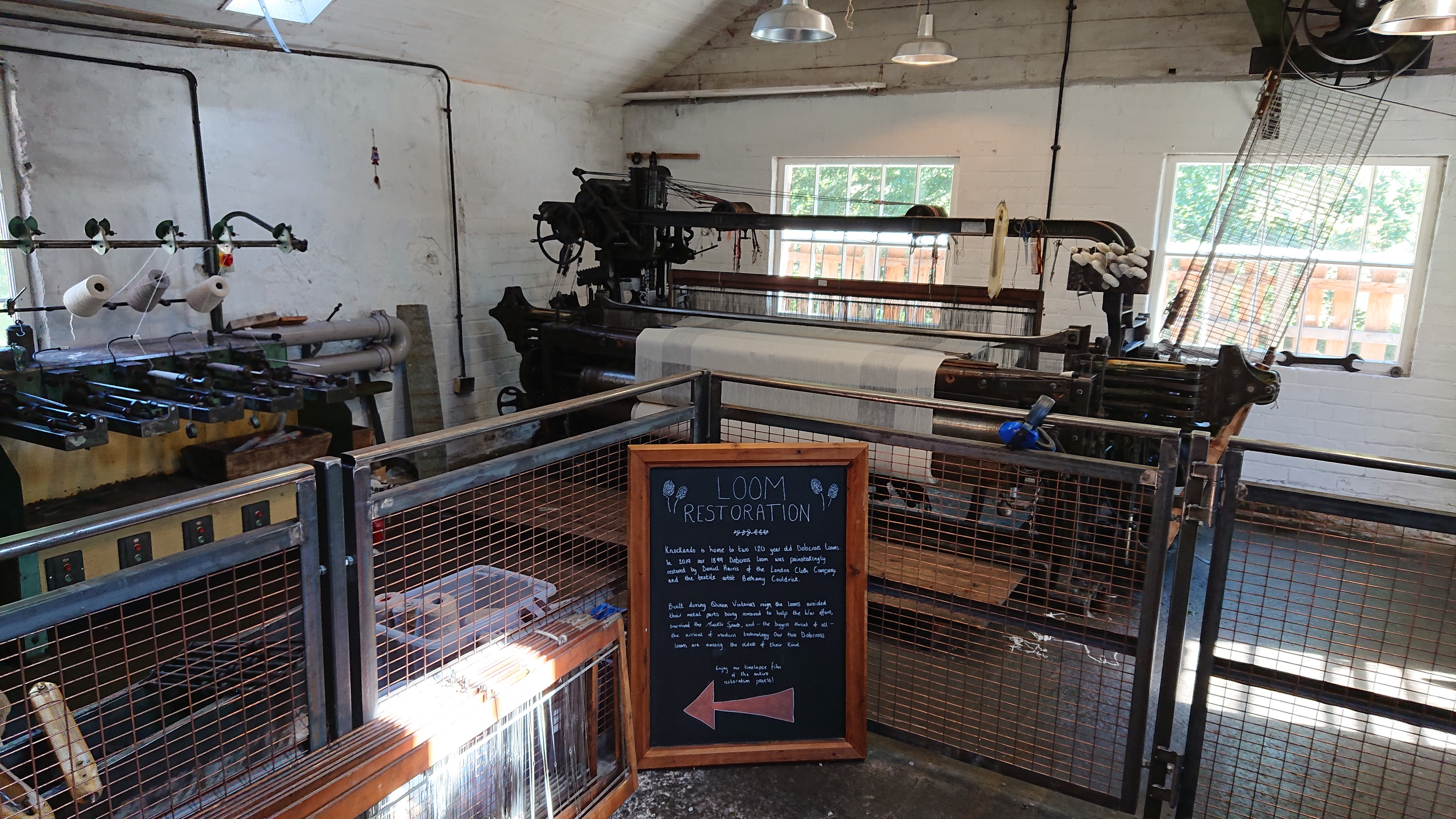
An historic loom at the Knockando Wool Mill

By the 1860s, the mill was owned by Alexander Smith, who established the company A Smith and Son. The company built a new building for the mill, which had some water-powered machinery, but most work at this point was still done by hand. In the 1870s, a second-hand water wheel, with a diameter of fourteen feet, was installed, and in the 1880s a weaving shed was built to house the water-powered loom. The late nineteenth century was a high-point for the mill's commercial success, as evidenced by the construction of the dwelling house for the miller's family, and the shop to sell the mill's produce.

In the early twentieth century, Knockando Woolmill primarily served the local market for blankets, tweeds and yarn, although it benefited from contracts from the Ministry of Defence during the first world war for blankets for the services, and it was during this period that the drying shed was built. In the years following the war, the mill entered a period of decline. In 1945, a flood destroyed the weaving shed, and in the late 1940s the waterwheel was disconnected and electric motors were installed to power the machinery.

By the 1960s, most small district mills had either expanded to serve a larger market, or had gone out of business. Unusually, Knockando continued to operate as a local mill, still owned by the company A Smith and Son established in 1860, now under the management of Duncan Stewart, a nephew of the Smith family who continued working at the mill into the 1970s. In 1976, the mill was purchased by Hugh Jones, who, acting as the sole miller, continued to operate it in the traditional manner for thirty years.

In 1995 the mill, including the machinery, water power system and various outhouses, was designated a Category A listed building, but by 2000 the buildings and machinery were in a poor state of repair, so a charity, the Knockando Woolmill Trust, was established to renovate and maintain them. By 2009, the trust had raised £3.3 million for renovations, including a grant of £1.3 million from the National Lottery Heritage Fund, and the ownership of the mill was transferred to the trust. Renovation work was completed in 2012, and production of fabric on the site resumed. In 2016, Knockando Woolen Mill won the Europa Nostra EU Prize for Cultural Heritage, in the Conservation category, and in 2017 it was awarded funding by Highlands and Islands Enterprise to allow it to expand its production and workforce.

== Tartan ==
Knockando Woolmill tartan

The Knockando Woolmill produces a unique tartan. Designed in 2010 by John B Gillespie to commemorate the renovation of the mill, the Knockando Woolmill Tartan is primarily composed of red, blue and green, intended to represent the rust from the iron roof of the mill, water from the burn, and grass from the surrounding fields. The tartan is registered with the Scottish Register of Tartans, and may only be manufactured at the Knockando Woolmill.

== Current usage ==
The mill continues to make fabrics on its historic machinery. It is open to visitors each year from 18 April to 26 September.
