= Holm, Inverness =

Suburb of Inverness, Highland, United Kingdom

Coordinates: 57.4581°N 4.2408°W

Holm is a small residential area in the south of the city of Inverness, Scotland. The area lies east of the River Ness.

The most prominent structure in the vicinity is the Holm Mills. The mill is known for its contribution to the Caledonian Canal, by weaving a cloth to prevent the embankments from leaking. Until recently, tartan was still being woven in the original building. The premises are now a shop and visitor centre.

A building occupied by Dick Precast Concrete is situated slightly south of Holm Mills. Additionally a large electrical substation is sited on Dores Road and this facility serves most of Inverness.

Bronze Age cist burial

== Holm Mains Farm - Archaeological discoveries ==
Two Early Bronze Age short cists and several outlying undated features have been excavated at Holm Mains located to the south-west of Inverness. The larger cist contained a crouched male inhumation lying on his left side. Accompanying this burial were two barbed and tanged arrowheads, ten other lithics and the fragments of a finely decorated beaker pot.

The other cist also contained an adult male, in a much poorer state of preservation, accompanied by a beaker pot. The cists uncovered at Holm Mains are part of a group of sites centred on the Culduthel area near the site of the Inverness Royal Academy, disparate pieces of a remarkably rich prehistoric landscape.

Barbed and tanged arrowhead

Beaker pot
