= Domestic furnishing in early modern Scotland =

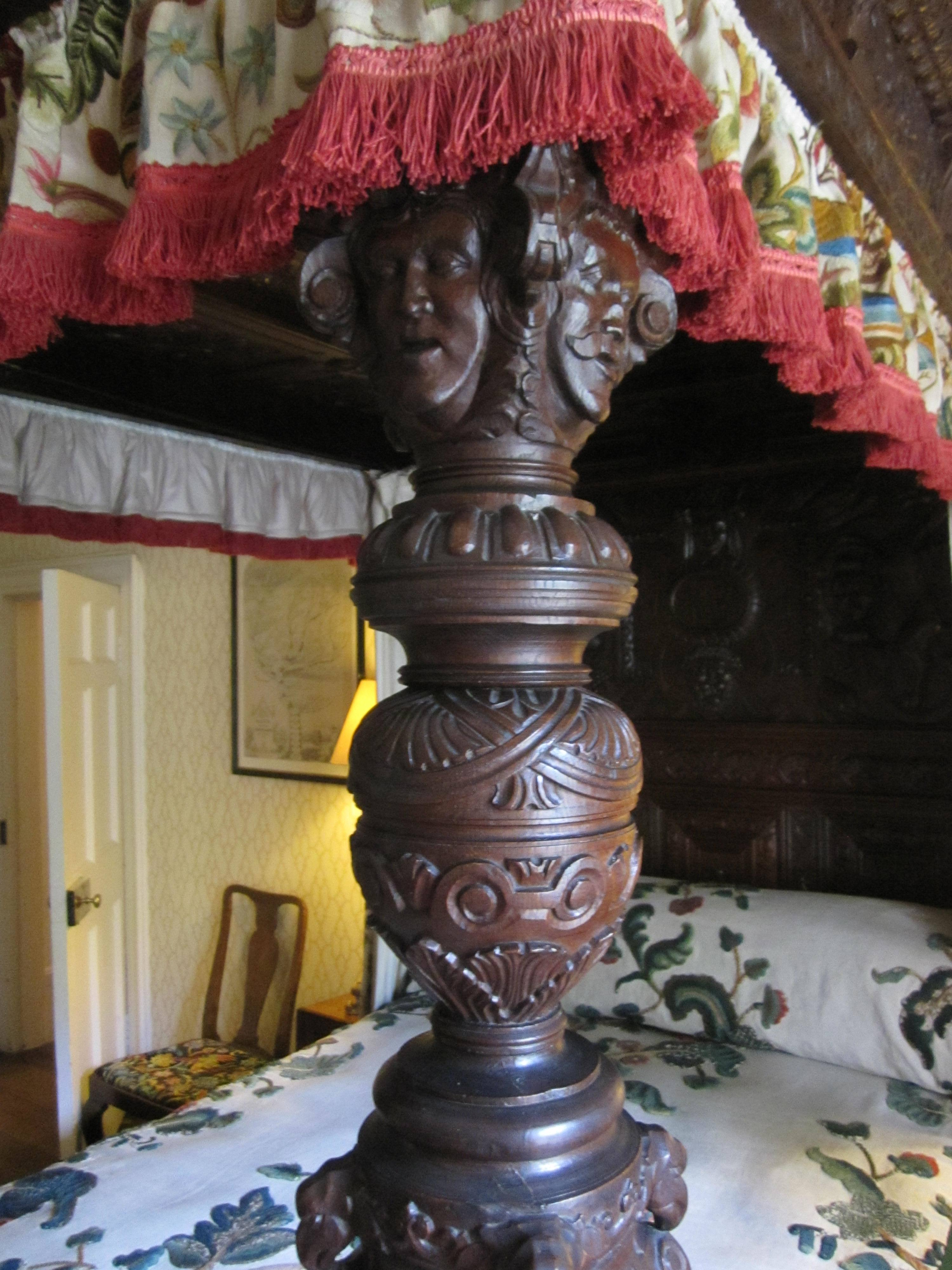
Scottish carved bed post at Crathes Castle

Furniture and furnishings in early modern and late medieval Scotland were made locally or imported, mostly from Flanders and France. Although few pieces of furniture survive from the early part of the period, a rich vocabulary and typology is preserved in inventories and wills. This documentary evidence in the Scots language details the homes of the wealthy and aristocratic. Textiles and beds belonging to Mary, Queen of Scots are very well documented. Scottish wooden furniture was often carved with the initials of married couples.

== Documentary sources and collections ==
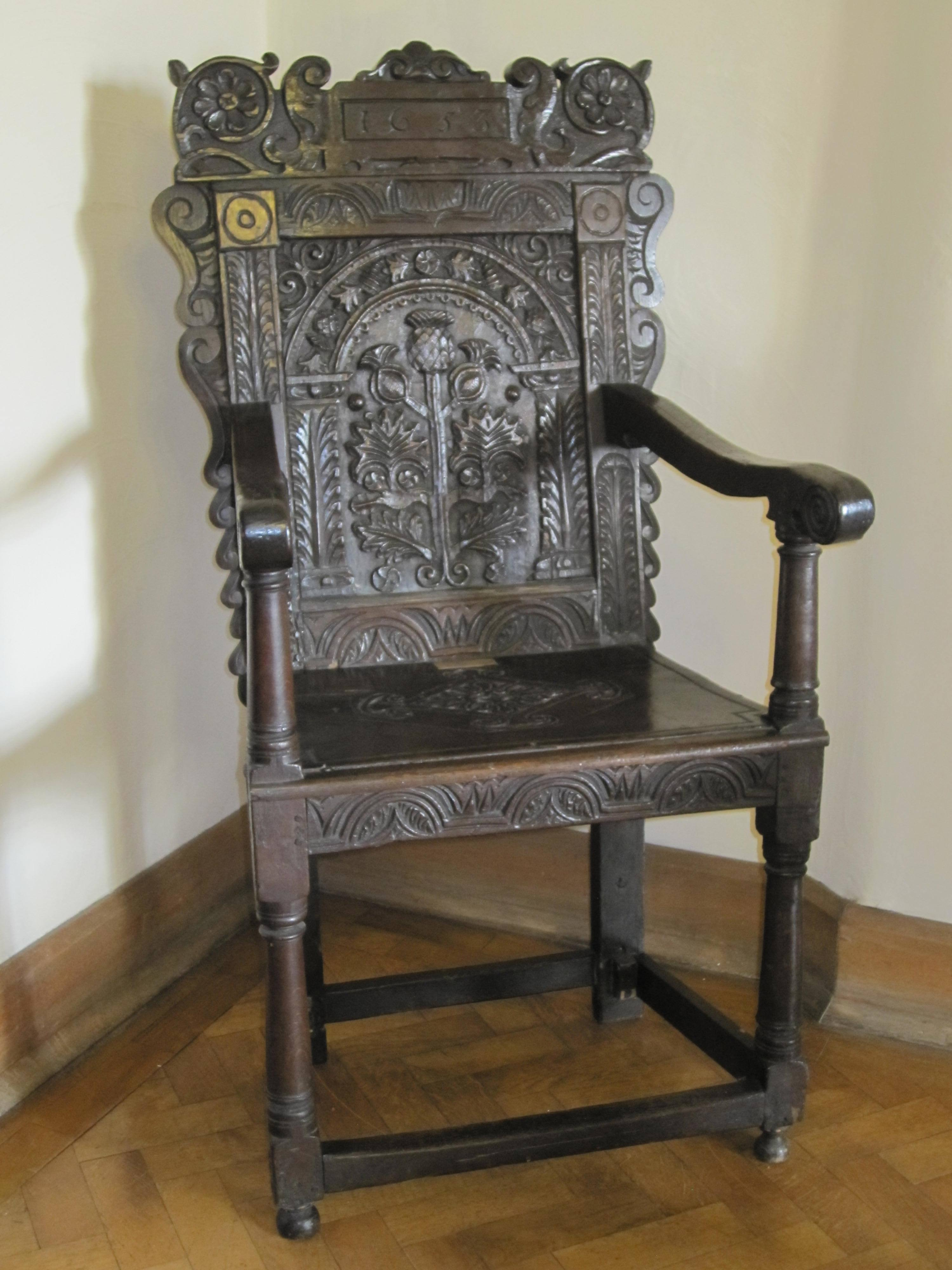
Chair with date 1653 and thistle motif at the House of Paisley (Paisley Abbey)

A survey of furniture and archival evidence (but lacking references) was published by John Warrack in 1920. Warrack investigated inventories found in Scottish wills. More recently, Margaret Sanderson presented a variety of sources and examples in her work A Kindly Place?

The inventories of the 16th-century royal household were published in 1815 and 1863. The royal inventory makers were concerned only with rich textiles and tapestries, and few other domestic items are mentioned. The mostly unpublished record of Edinburgh's baillie court, running from 1582 onwards, known as the Register of Decreets, details the sales or "apprisals" of debtors' goods including many items of costume and some pieces of furniture, such as "ane auld almery of aik" (an oak cupboard), "a painted bed of fir", and "ane balhoillie coffer coverit with blak ledder".

References to many published Scottish household inventories are included in Simon Swynfen Jervis, British and Irish Inventories (London, 2010). Lists of furniture and movables were formally known as "inventories of plenishing". The architectural ambitions and furnishings of the political elite in late 17th-century Scotland revealed in inventories were investigated by Charles Wemyss. At Drumlanrig Castle, a dressing room for the Duke of Queensbury included the modern convenience of "a lead close stool in a wainscot box with a lead pipe for the water to come in and a large one for the Excrements to go out". A taste for London-made furnishings was satisfied by new workshops in Edinburgh, including the making of cane backed and seated chairs by William Scott, by James Leblanc of the Canongate who made looking-glasses, and Sarah Dalrymple who painted furniture in the Japan style. Sarah Dalrymple argued with other suppliers and glass manufacturers, including Scott and Leblanc, and petitioned Parliament over a possible monopoly on glass for mirrors and lighting sconces that would destroy her business.

Significant early antiquarian collectors of Scottish furnishings include Walter Scott, Charles Kirkpatrick Sharpe, William Stirling-Maxwell, William Fraser, and Joseph Noel Paton. Paton's sister, the sculptor Amelia Robertson Hill, (wife of the photographer David Octavius Hill) described how her father obtained a cradle in Linlithgow thought to have been that of Mary, Queen of Scots. In the 1830s he employed a man to hunt for old furniture near the abandoned royal palaces. He discovered the cradle in use in a dwelling near Linlithgow Palace. The mother told Paton's agent it was the Queen's cradle, and she would not part with it, even for £1. Paton heard the story and bought the cradle. Theodore Napier gave the cradle to the National Museum in 1912. It was made long after the Stewarts left Scotland.

Examples of surviving furniture considered to be of good provenance were drawn and published by John William Small, an architect and furniture-maker based in Stirling, as Scottish Woodwork of the Sixteenth & Seventeenth Centuries (Stirling & London, 1878). Towards the end of the 19th-century, a fashion for "oak rooms" loosely based on historic interiors, was supplied by new reproduction pieces, some supplied by Small's workshop in Stirling, the North British Art Furniture Works.

William Burrell donated Scottish furniture now shown at Provand's Lordship in Glasgow. Marc Ellington collected furniture at Towie Barclay, including an early Scottish cupboard or dresser dated 1613, now displayed at the V&A Dundee. The National Museum of Scotland has a well-known chair, a Scottish caquetoire, with the initials and star heraldry of Annabell Murray, Countess of Mar. The chair furnished Alloa Tower, and was traditionally regarded as a nursing chair. An earlier chair associated with the Baillie and Ross families of Lamington and known as William Wallace's chair is kept by Mohamed Al-Fayed at Balnagown Castle. The Great Hall at Darnaway Castle houses a late medieval chair known as "Randolph's chair". Furniture in rural, Highland, or vernacular use was collected by Isabel Grant, George 'Taffy' Davidson, Jean Maitland of Burnside, Forfar, and Margaret Michie.

== Beds ==
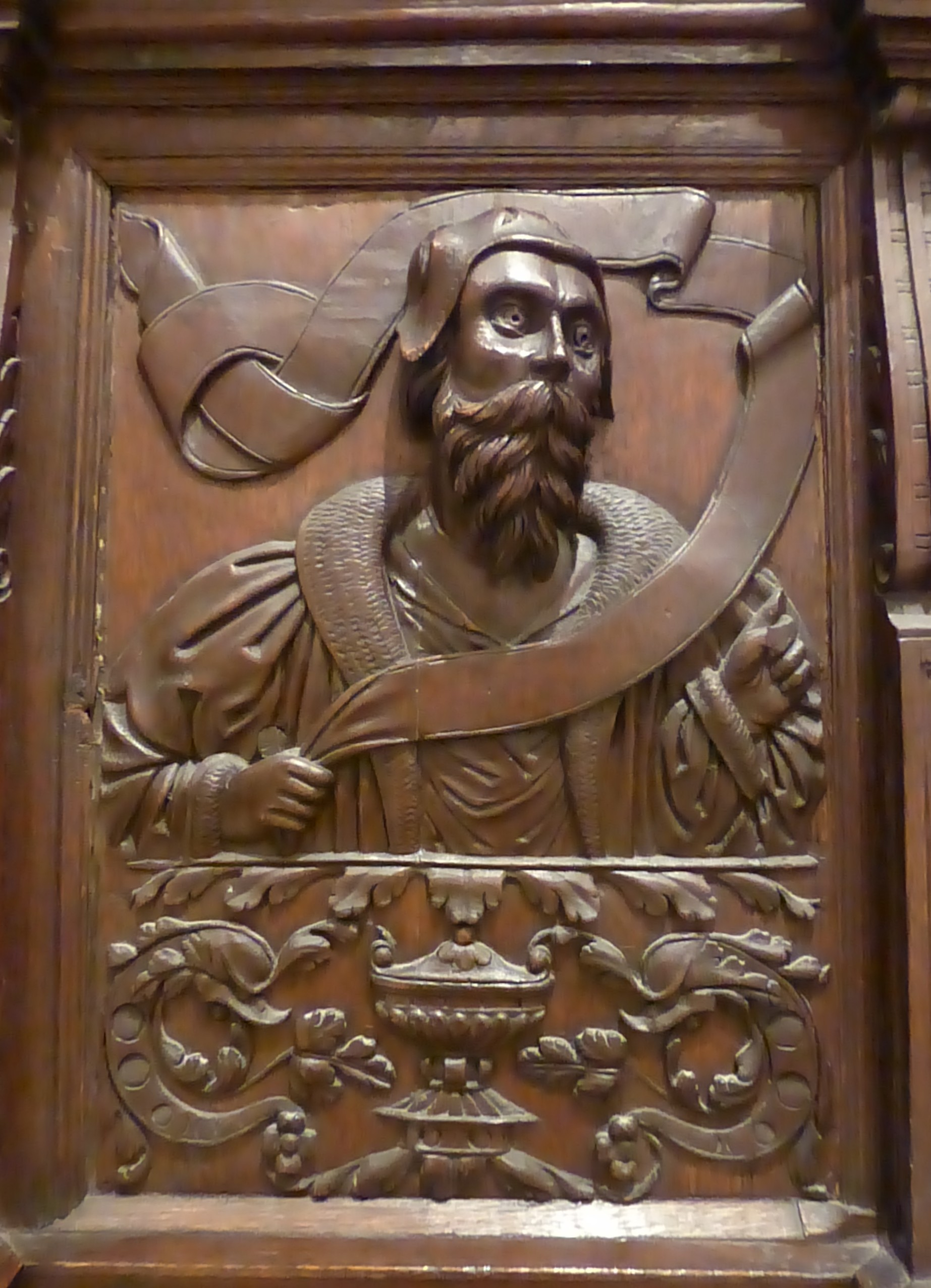
A 16th-century carved panel from Killochan Castle which probably formed part of a dais board in the Great Hall, the figure may represent a member of the Cathcart family. National Museums of Scotland.

There were several kinds of beds. A richly carved bed at Crathes Castle with Burnett family monograms is one of the few surviving 16th-century Scottish beds, attributed to an Aberdeen school of carving. There is also a set of two chairs at Crathes, for the laird Alexander Burnet and one for his wife Katherine Gordon, hers with Gordon heraldry and dated 1597. In April 1581 James VI had a "stand bed" made of walnut timber and painted, with an oak dining table. These stand beds were free-standing wooden structures with posts.

James IV owned a "tursing bed", suitable to be packed and tied up for transport around Scotland. He won a lit (camp bed) from an Edinburgh merchant, Arthur Bruce, while playing cards at the merchant's house. James also won a stick of Holland linen, a box, and other merchandise. Bruce was compensated with a gift of 40 gold crowns and was probably a regular supplier of furnishings to the royal houses.

James V had a bed made for use on his ships. When James V married Madeleine of Valois, his father-in-law Francis I gave him Arras tapestry, cloths of estate, three rich beds with all their furniture (curtains and counterpanes) of silk and gold, two cupboards of silver gilt plate, table carpets, and Persian carpets.

According to the chronicle of Robert Lindsay of Pitscottie, Madeleine chose these items herself from the French royal wardrobe. French records mention that Francis I commissioned a new bed for the couple. After James V died in 1542, an inventory recorded a green velvet bed in the wardrobe of Falkland Palace with velvet covered posts, packed in coffers and travel bags called "sowmes". The packing cases for Madeleine's furniture were made in Paris by Hermant Therolde. There was also a suite of stools for her ladies in waiting, six stools for "wemen to sit upoun coverit with sad cramasy (red) velvott". James Carvour made a pair of folding stools for her entry or arrival.

A "kaissit" or cased bed was enclosed in timber. These were also known as "close beds". Fynes Moryson described a type of wooden bed in 1598 as "cupboards in the wall, with doors to be opened and shut at pleasure". A wooden bed built into the wall panelling can be seen at Craigievar Castle, converted in the early 20th-century to hold a bathtub. A wooden close bed or box-bed was an "essay" or apprentice piece for an Edinburgh wright in 1683, and such beds remained a feature of a range of Scottish homes into the 19th-century.

A "laich" or low bed had no canopy or posts, and some laich beds could be tucked away under a larger bed. In 1578 Margaret Kennedy, Countess of Cassilis discussed the design or "fassone" of a laich bed with her daughter, asking her to get one made of pine wood for £3 Scots. At Polnoon Castle in 1623 there was a bed in the lord's chamber with red and yellow satin curtains and a "by bed" with no curtains or canopy.

Best beds were hung with expensive and embroidered fabrics, trimmings and passementerie. Colin Campbell of Glenorchy and Katherine Ruthven owned a valance (an embroidered strip running around the top of the bed curtains) depicting Adam and Eve, with their initials. They married in 1550. The valance was used at Balloch and is now at the Burrell Collection. It was worked with silk threads on linen canvas, probably by a professional embroiderer in Scotland. These valances were usually called "pands" in Scots. There was an unfinished canvas or linen valance with its embroidery pattern drawn on paper amongst the wardrobe goods of Mary, Queen of Scots. Another pand was embroidered with flowers, "flourit with sindrie hewis of silk".

=== Beds for Mary, Queen of Scots and the Earl of Moray ===
Mary returned to Scotland after the death of her first husband Francis II. According to the terms of her dowry she may have been allowed some furnishing from the French royal palaces including Fontainebleau. Inventories of furnishings and beds consigned to charge of her wardrobe servant Servais de Condé at Holyrood Palace in September and November 1561, written in the Scots Language may include such items. Mary was able to furnish her lodgings and council chamber at Holyrood with beds and furnishings appropriate to royal government. Eleven of Mary's timber bed frames, later stored in Edinburgh Castle, were identified as French in 1578.

Many of the pieces listed in the two inventories of 1561, several described as old, can be identified in the inventories of her father James V and were probably unpacked from storage in Edinburgh Castle. Other royal property, including cloths of estate and jewels, was returned to Mary in 1556 after the Earl of Arran gave up the Regency. Mary's French wardrobe staff, tailors, and tapissiers constructed new beds in their workshop at Holyrood and restyled and refurbished old designs.

Mary almost suffocated at Stirling Castle in September 1561 when a candle set her bed curtains and "tester", as the English diplomat Thomas Randolph called her canopy or head-cloth, on fire. A French poet, Chastelard, was found on 14 February 1563, St Valentine's day hiding in Mary's chamber under her Great Bed at Rossend Castle at Burntisland in Fife.

Mary's half-brother, James Stewart, then Earl of Mar owned a "standing bed" of oak made by a man called Schange in 1562. Several carpenters or wrights in Perth and Edinburgh were called Schang. Patrick Schang made the beheading device known as the "Maiden" kept in the National Museum of Scotland.

Mary's French vocabulary and the French words used by her clerks caused confusion in her lifetime. In 1584, Ralph Sadler explained that she wanted Turkey-work rugs to lay around her bed. A phrase used for these rough hairy rugs tapisserie velue had been confused with velvet cloths, tapisserie de veloux.

=== Refashioning royal beds in the 1560s ===
Mary, Queen of Scots, ordered her wardrobe staff to mend and reform her beds. Precious fabrics were recycled. Black velvet was taken from a dais or canopy of state for a bed that lacked its back or dossier, which had been stolen. More velvet was taken from the curtains and the lower part of another old bed. The wardrobe staff kept a record of the fabrics:

Plus pour parachever de rabiller ledict lict il a este a prins le soubassement et les rideaux d'ung aultre viei lict de velours noir.

Also, for finishing the repair of the said bed, black velvet was taken from the lower part and the curtains of another old bed.

Luxurious fabric beds in aristocratic homes, with canopies often suspended from above, were described as "chapel beds" over a long period. Mary, Queen of Scots, confiscated chapel beds from Huntly Castle in 1562, and shipped them to Holyroodhouse. She ordered her wardrobe servant Servais de Condé to reconstruct them with upholstered posts to suit current fashion.

Mary's chapel bed of incarnate coloured damask was dismantled in 1566, and the fabrics and bed hangings were deployed on other beds named by their embroidered motifs; the Bed of Amity, the Bed of Phoenix, the green velvet bed with embroidery works or ouvraiges, and a smaller crimson velvet bed with "knots of love" known as the Lit de las Damours [sic]. The Bed of Amity, of French origin and decorated with "ciphers of A", had been refurbished in 1561, probably to take to the planned interview with Elizabeth I at Nottingham. In October 1566, the Amity, Phoenix, and Jennet beds were spruced up for the baptism of Prince James at Stirling Castle.

=== Upholstery at Mary's court ===
Mary employed an upholsterer, Nicholas Guillebault, described as her "menusier". He undertook a variety of tasks, working on beds, chairs, stools and close stools, using damask fabrics and Morocco leather. In June 1564, Nicholas worked with an embroiderer to cover a casket with black velvet which Mary used to keep her papers in. Mary had larger coffers to transport her clothes, and three "coffre a mullet" kept in her bedchamber for her clothes. These were lined with "plet", a kind of canvas or linen.

Another menusier, Mathieu, lined boxes and covered wooden bed posts with embroidered black satin in November 1562. Nicholas Guillebault continued to work for the court after Mary's abdication, and in October 1567 upholstered a chair for the infant James VI and I at Stirling Castle with blue velvet.

=== Beds at the Kirk o'Field lodging ===
When Lord Darnley arrived at the Provost's Lodging at Kirk o'Field in February 1567, Mary asked Servais de Condé to provide tapestry hangings for the chamber and a new bed of black figured velvet. After a couple of nights the Queen had the black bed replaced with an old purple one, because bath water or steam used to treat the sick king might spoil the new bed. The purple bed was suitable for travel "accustomed to be carried". She had a green bed for herself placed in a lower (laich) chamber. The changes of furnishing were detailed in the evidence given by Darnley's servant Thomas Nelson. George Buchanan argued that the substitution of beds proved Mary's knowledge and involvement in the subsequent explosion.

In the morning after Darnley's murder, the queen's servant Nicolas Hubert, known as French Paris, came to her bedchamber at Holyrood Palace to hang her bed with black curtains for mourning and light candles in the ruelle, a space between the bed and the wall. He spoke to a lady in waiting Madame de Bryant, and noticed her talking privately with James Hepburn, 4th Earl of Bothwell, who was concealed behind a curtain.

=== Later state beds ===
Archibald Douglas, 8th Earl of Angus was sent into exile in 1581, and carried some of his furnishings to England. He left his best beds from Tantallon Castle with Lord Hunsdon at Berwick-upon-Tweed, including a bed of green velvet and damask, a bed of crimson velvet "fair embroidered with images and beasts of gold", and a bed of cloth of silver and cloth of gold. The bed of James VI caught fire at the wedding of the young laird of Ferniehirst in 1585, presumably as he read by candlelight.

A carved walnut bed from Dunfermline Palace, thought to have belonged to Anne of Denmark, was transferred to an inn in the town, and was later dismantled to embellish a fireplace at nearby Broomhall House. In 1760 the antiquarian Richard Pococke saw this bed at the inn and described it, seeing in the carvings of caryatid figures of a men and women emblems of fidelity and benevolence. The innkeeper, Mrs Walker, told him the bed had been sent from Denmark, that it was the royal marriage bed, and that Charles I was born in it.

At the time of the birth of Charles I, a different fabric-hung bed was made for the queen at Dunfermline Palace, described as a "chapel bed". It had green velvet curtains lined with Spanish taffeta. Four embroiderers decorated the bed with gold and silver trim and green silk latchets. During their work they were accommodated in two beds at the palace. An embroiderer, Thomas Barclay, was made a permanent member of the queen's household in November 1602.

Jean Stewart (died 1605), a former lady in waiting to Anne of Denmark, had several beds and sets of bed curtains at Ardstinchar and Bargany in Ayrshire. The curtains were made of red, blue, and yellow taffeta, black figured taffeta, green damask, red and white embroidered curtains with a red velvet "pinnacle" and a scarlet embroidered "pinnacle" (perhaps "pendicle"), gray, blue, green curtains with a scarlet canopy, red stemming, red grosgrain, and tartan. Warm woollen fabrics were preferred in winter. The fabric called "tartan" in 1605 probably differed from the material woven today.

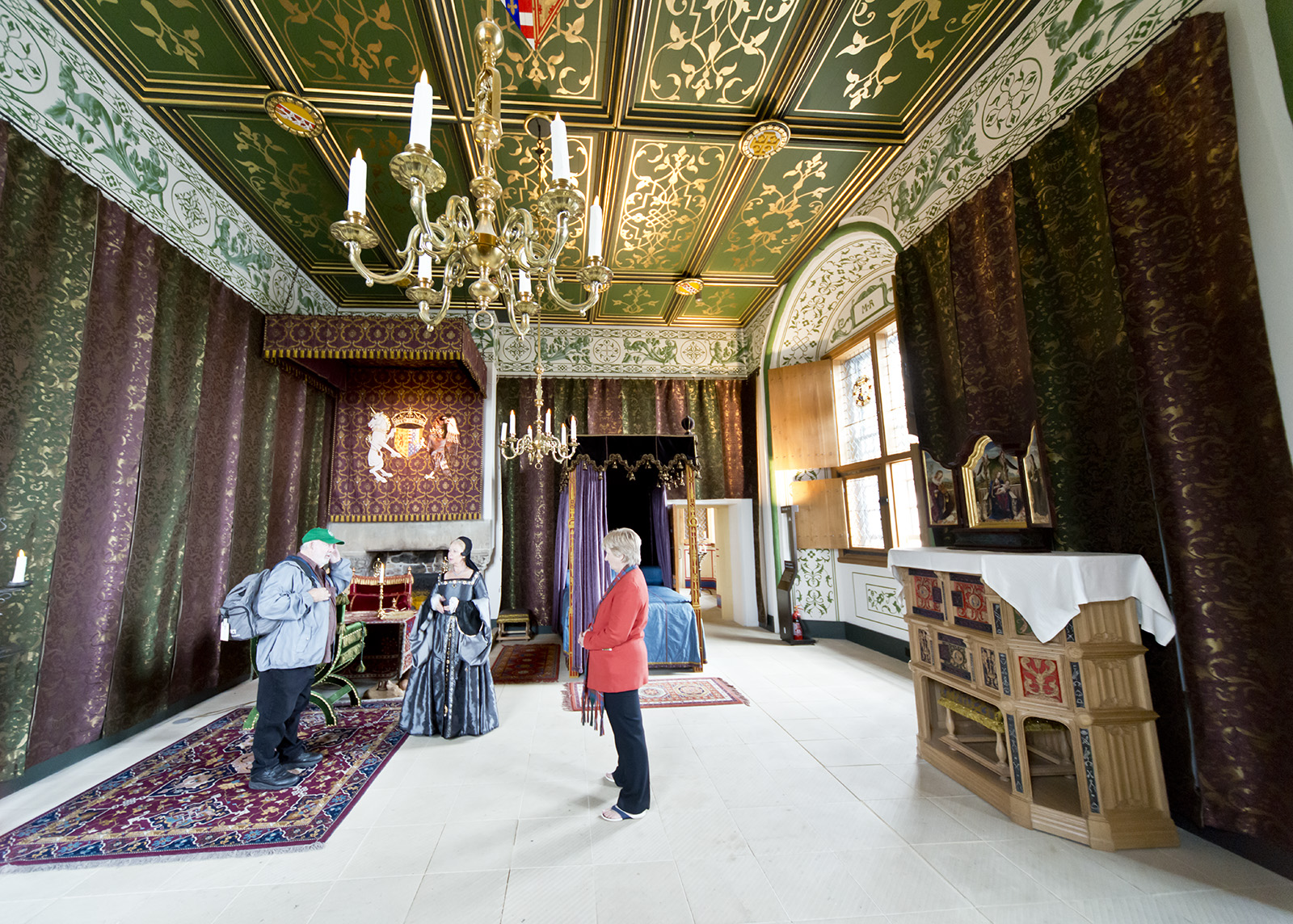
The walls of the bedchamber of Mary of Guise at Stirling Castle are now hung with alternate lengths of green and purple silk damask, commissioned according to inventory evidence.

=== Drawing chambers and couches ===
After the Union of the Crowns in 1603, some aristocrats bought furnishings in London. Correspondence shows direct emulation of fashion at the court of Anne of Denmark. Anne Livingstone, Countess of Eglinton wrote to Jean Ruthven at Whitehall asking for an estimate for a "resting chair" like one owned by the leading courtier Jean Drummond. Ruthven explained that a resting chair or couch made with beech wood was cheapest. Eglinton also asked for advice on lace and a piccadill in the latest style.

In the first decades of the 17th century, withdrawing chambers or drawing rooms first appear. Such rooms were locating between bed chambers and more public spaces like galleries These were sometimes furnished with couches. At Caerlaverock Castle, a suite of cloth of silver furniture with a couch in a drawing chamber in 1640 can be associated with Elizabeth Beaumont, Countess of Nithsdale, a cousin of the Duke of Buckingham. Mary Sutton, Countess of Home, had a number of couches in withdrawing rooms at Moray House in the Canongate and Dunglass Castle.

=== Textiles for beds ===
Silk and metallic thread were woven in Scotland to make passementerie trimmings and fringes for upholstery and bed curtains. Colin Campbell of Glenorchy (died 1640) employed a silk weaver from Antwerp, Nicolas Herman, who had set up his workshop in Perth, to make passementerie for his beds at Balloch. An inventory was made of Herman's own furnishings, his stock of trimmings and thread, and tools used by five employees in his Perth workshop. An Edinburgh furniture maker, Walter Denniestone, had a "painted bed" in his workshop when he died in 1631. Another Edinburgh wright, Jeromie Young, was making two "wainscot beddis, the ane carvit, and the uthir not carvit" in 1645.

Some women of the upper classes made furnishings. In October 1642 when James Stuart, 4th Earl of Moray was expected in Aberdeenshire, Jean Ross, Lady Innes wrote to her mother Margaret, Lady Ross, describing how she was making a bed and dressing "a chalmer or twa" in case he visited her. She wrote that the Earl was "veri curious" about interior decoration. The curtains of Lady Innes' new bed were to be made of "sad green serge of our aune making", a textile made from wool from her farms. Fringes and lace for the bed would have to be bought elsewhere from an urban centre.

== Tables and chairs ==
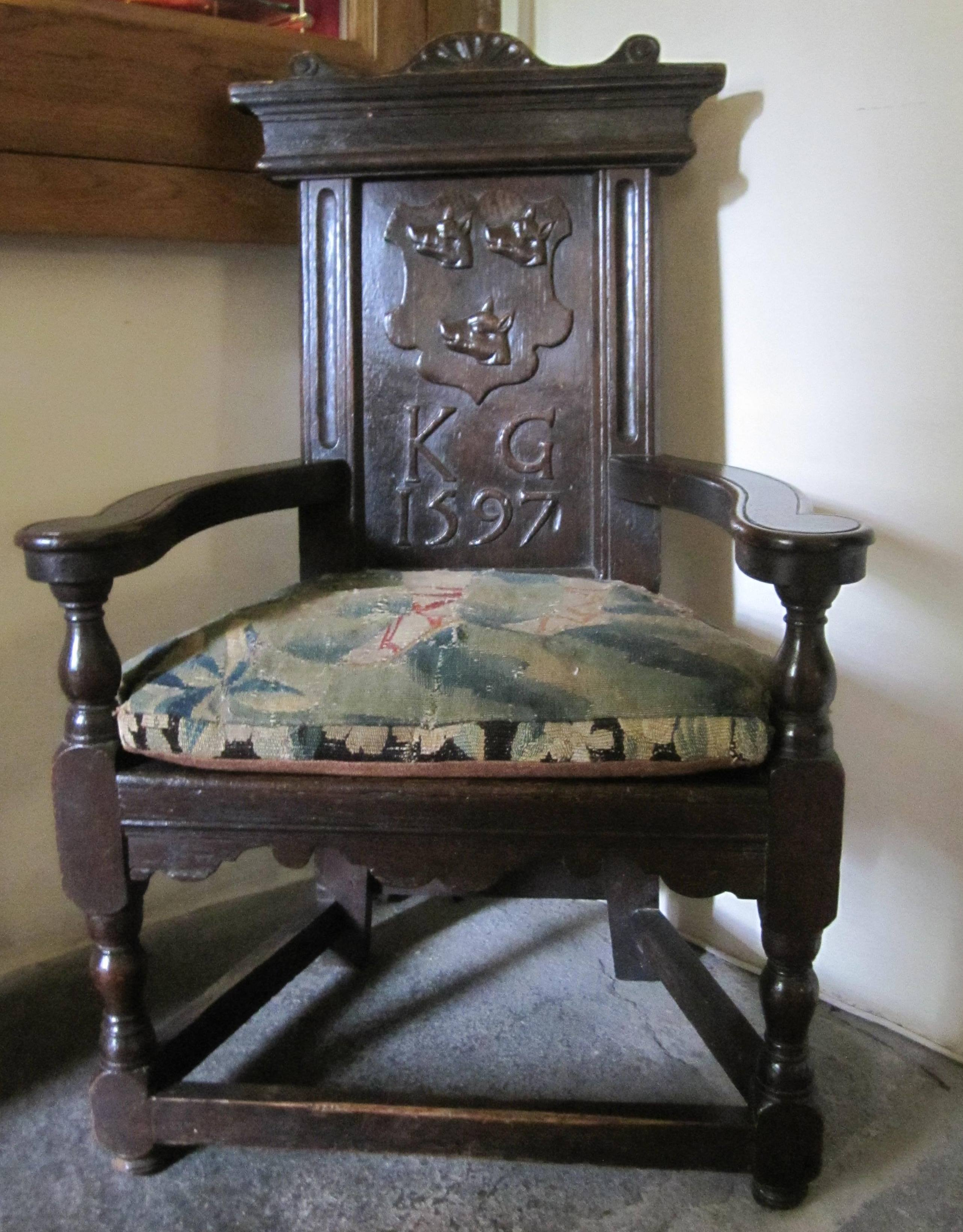
Chair made for Katherine Gordon, 1597, Crathes Castle. This type of chair much later became known as a "caqueteuse", a contemporary French chair was called "caquetoire".

James VI had a "bilzeart burde" covered with green cloth at Holyrood Palace in 1581. "Burde" or board was the usual Scots word for table. A dining table was called a "meit board", and usually placed in the hall of larger homes. Food, not only meat, was known as "meit". Some stood on trestles, but inventories as frequently mention frames, called "branders" or "cradles". William Colville, Commendator of Culross, had tables with cradles of fir and oak in his lodging in Edinburgh worth 35 shillings each, which were sold after his death in 1556 to help pay his rent.

Tables in the hall were supplied with benches called "forms". The forms were sometimes fixed to the table, and so it is unlikely such dining furniture was frequently cleared away for other activities. Usually, in the hall of the castle, there was a high table for the laird and family, and two or three "syde boards" for the rest of the household and servants.

Inventories often detail napkins, in several qualities, best linen "French damask", "Bertane" (Breton) linen, "Flanders dornick" for the high table, and lesser qualities for the side "by buird" tables. Napkins were called "serveitts". Table linen was made in Scotland.

A noble diner would have a cupboard in the hall with a display of silverware on shelves covered with fine linen "cupboard cloths". Drinks were served from the cupboard. The word "cupboard" was often used for the silver plate rather than the piece of furniture. In 1523 Margaret Tudor wrote she was forced to "lay my cupbord in plege", to pawn her silver for money. An English observer, the herald John Young, noted that James IV dined in a chamber with a "dresser" in a chamber at Holyrood in 1503, made "after the guyse of the countre", in Scottish fashion.

Seating included "buffet stools" and "backed stools", mentioned as early as 1478 in the inventory of Edinburgh burgess, and probably both types would now be identified as chairs. The usual Scots word for a stool was a "stule". The usual Scots word for chair was "schyre", spelled in various forms. Un the 16th century, the "great chairs" at the high table for the laird and his wife were often made in the form of a "caquetoire", or "caqueteuse", a modern name for a style of chair apparently influenced by French designs. Surviving examples are often carved with owners initials, and their provenance can be established. There are few surviving early Scottish tables or backless stools.

Two letters mention that Mary, Queen of Scots, had conversations in informal meetings while sitting on a chest or coffer, at Stirling Castle in September 1561 while talking to Lord Darnley's schoolmaster Arthur Lallart, and at Edinburgh Castle in 1566, while talking to Christopher Rokeby.

For food preparation, a kitchen table was called a "dressing burd" and there were also "pantrie burds". Wealthy burgesses and merchants owned drawing-tables, with extending leaves. In Edinburgh, Robert Cooper had a "lang drawen burd of French wark". A carpenter aspiring to become a master in the Edinburgh craft incorporation in 1555 made an essay of a "drawin burde" with two leaves. One of the judges of his workmanship was Andrew Mansioun, a French craftsman who worked for the royal family.

By the 1630s, the Anglo-Scottish Mary Sutton, Countess of Home had two or three marble-topped tables at her Canongate townhouse, now called Moray House. These were used for intimate banquets, set with chairs from the three suites of gilded and painted chairs of the "Italian fashion" which she had bought in London. These English-made sgabello chairs are particularly associated with Holland House and with the royal favourite, the Duke of Buckingham. As fashions changed, in 1650 her daughter Margaret Home, Countess of Moray had the chairs painted green for use in the garden at Donibristle House.

== Kitchen and pantry ==
A kind of kitchen dresser or perhaps dining room furniture was known as a "cup almery". A will made in 1549 mentions the "tyne stoups that stand upon the coip almorye", a row of pewter measuring jugs. These jugs are mentioned in many household inventories. Food could be kept outside the kitchen, the poet David Lyndsay owned a "cop almery" and a "meit almery syloreit", a piece with some carved elaboration.

In 1572 the kitchen of Regent Mar was equipped with a great pot for salt beef, with seven smaller pots for pottages and five pans. The pantry was used to store tablecloths and napkins called "serviottis". Napkins were provided in several qualities according to the status of the diner. Much of the linen was called "Dornick" from the Dutch name of one producing town, Tournai. Table linen in Mar's pantry made in Scotland was called "Scoittis dorneik".

Marie Stewart, Countess of Mar countersigned an inventory for Brechin Castle which records that three of two dozen great pewter charger plates were stolen during the royal visit in May 1617. The Brechin inventory lists the spits, racks, and ladles in the kitchen. There was a "laverock spit" for roast hare and a "cavie" or coop for poultry. The pantry had shelving of fir wood, two tables and a "langsaddle" seat, and two storage chests or arks called "pantrie cadgits".

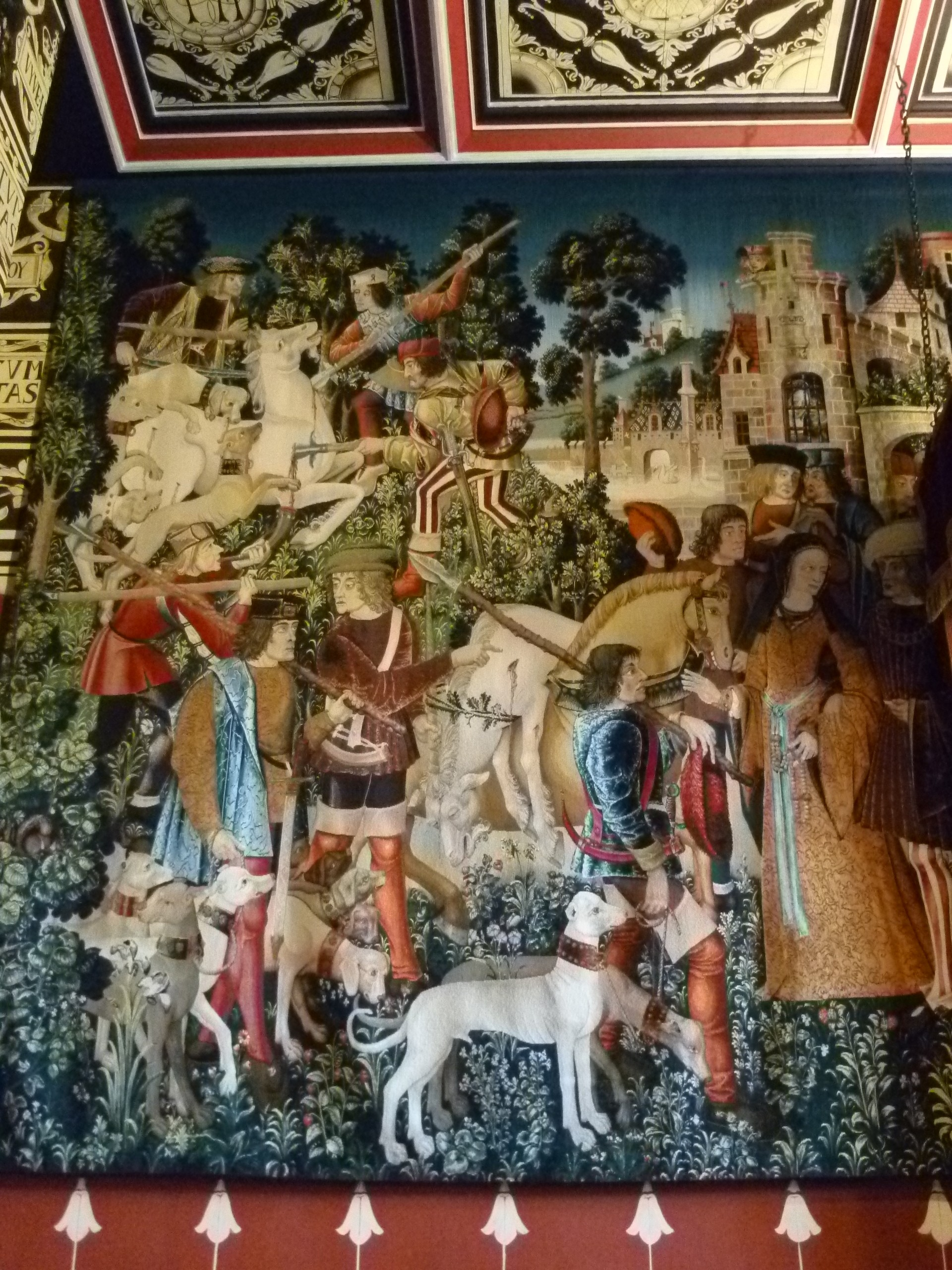
A new tapestry of The Hunt of the Unicorn at Stirling Castle, the recent painted decoration follows an example from Winchester from the time of the wedding of Mary Tudor and Philip II

Spice houses and larders are also mentioned in inventories. Female servants worked in spaces called "womanhouses". Their tasks were not all directly concerned with the kitchen, brewing, or laundry. At Aberdour Castle, the womanhouse contained combs and spinning wheels in the 1640s. An upper and lower woman house at Balgonie Castle in 1675 had lint-wheels, dairy, and laundry equipment. At both castles the womanhouses had beds for the women. Annabell Murray, Countess of Mar (died 1603) left a legacy to Janet Scobie and to the three women who worked in the womanhouse with her, and to the lavendar (laundress). The Countess of Mar also left a legacy to her servant Jonet Patersoune, who was a kind of still-room assistant, of "the whole drugs extant in my possession the time of decease together with my whole stillitoures, glasses, leam (earthenware) pots, and other furniture pertaining thereto".

== Close stools and stools of ease ==
Latrine shafts and seats fashioned in masonry can still be seen in the ruins of some Scottish castles and palaces like Dirleton, Elcho, and Falkland. In the 16th-century, James V used a stool of ease, close stool, or dry stool. These were portable boxes with seats, containing ceramic or tin basins which were emptied and cleaned by servants. The royal versions were covered with rich fabrics like velvet and were placed in a bedchamber or other room under a canopy suspended from the ceiling. In 1539 James V had a green damask canopy fringed with gold and silk and another of red damask for this purpose.

Mary, Queen of Scots, had a stool of ease covered with green velvet, three with "purpour" and "crammosie broun" velvet, one with yellow damask, and another iron-bound stool covered with leather. These contained tin or pewter basins. Two older close stools were covered with green cloth. in October 1566, her upholsterer or menusier, Nicolas Guillebault, covered one close stool with green velvet and another with figured black velvet. Her inventories mention a canopy of green taffeta suitable both to suspend over a bed or close stool. Another canopy of yellow shot silk taffeta for a stool of ease was used to furnish Lord Darnley's lodging at the Kirk o'Field and destroyed in the explosion. Her secretary Claude Nau described Mary talking to the Countess of Huntly about their plans to escape from Holyroodhouse after the murder of David Rizzio, while she was sitting on her close stool or chaise percée.

== Tapestry and wall hangings ==
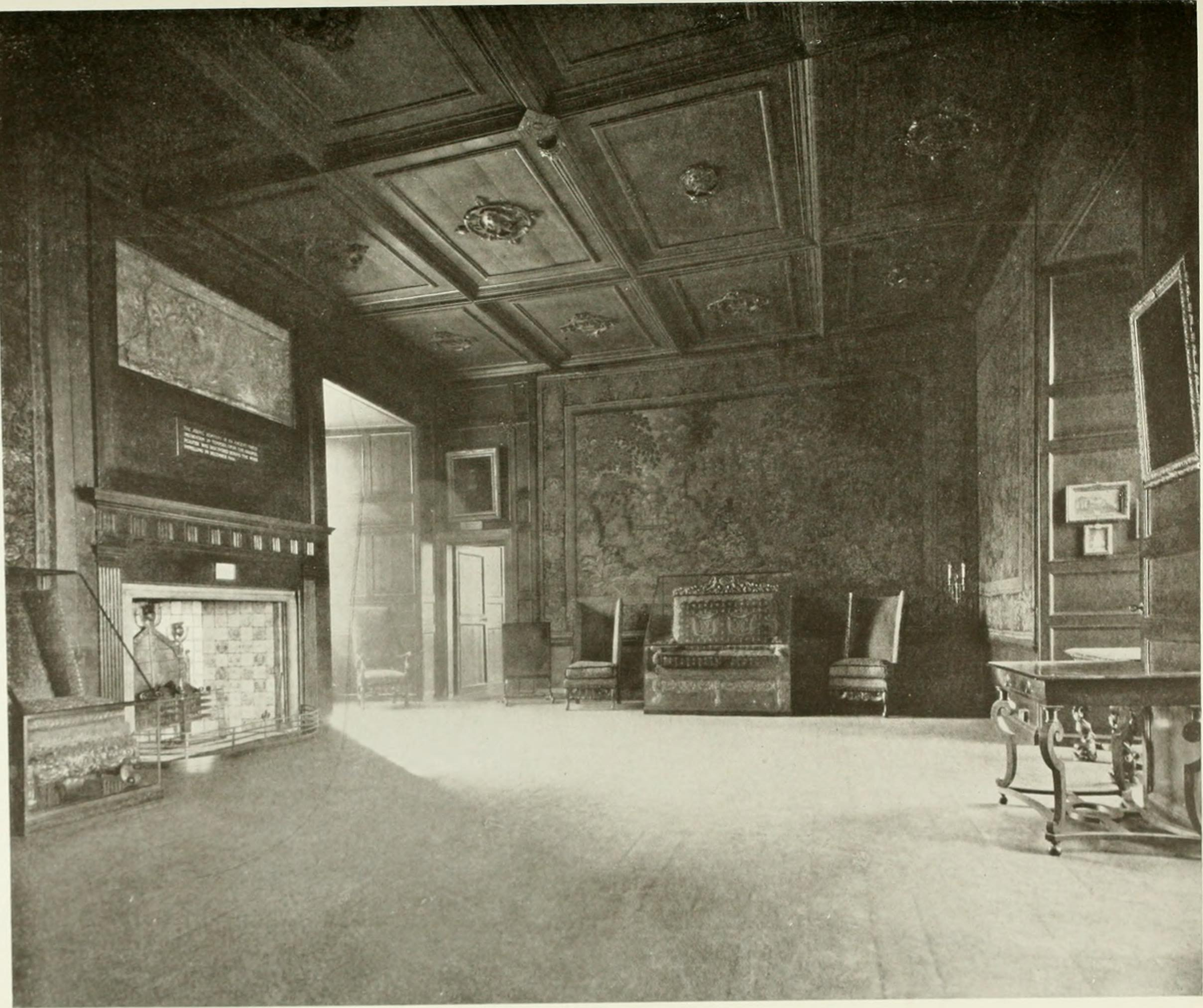
The ceiling of the Audience Chamber at Holyroodhouse includes heraldic badges carved for Mary of Guise

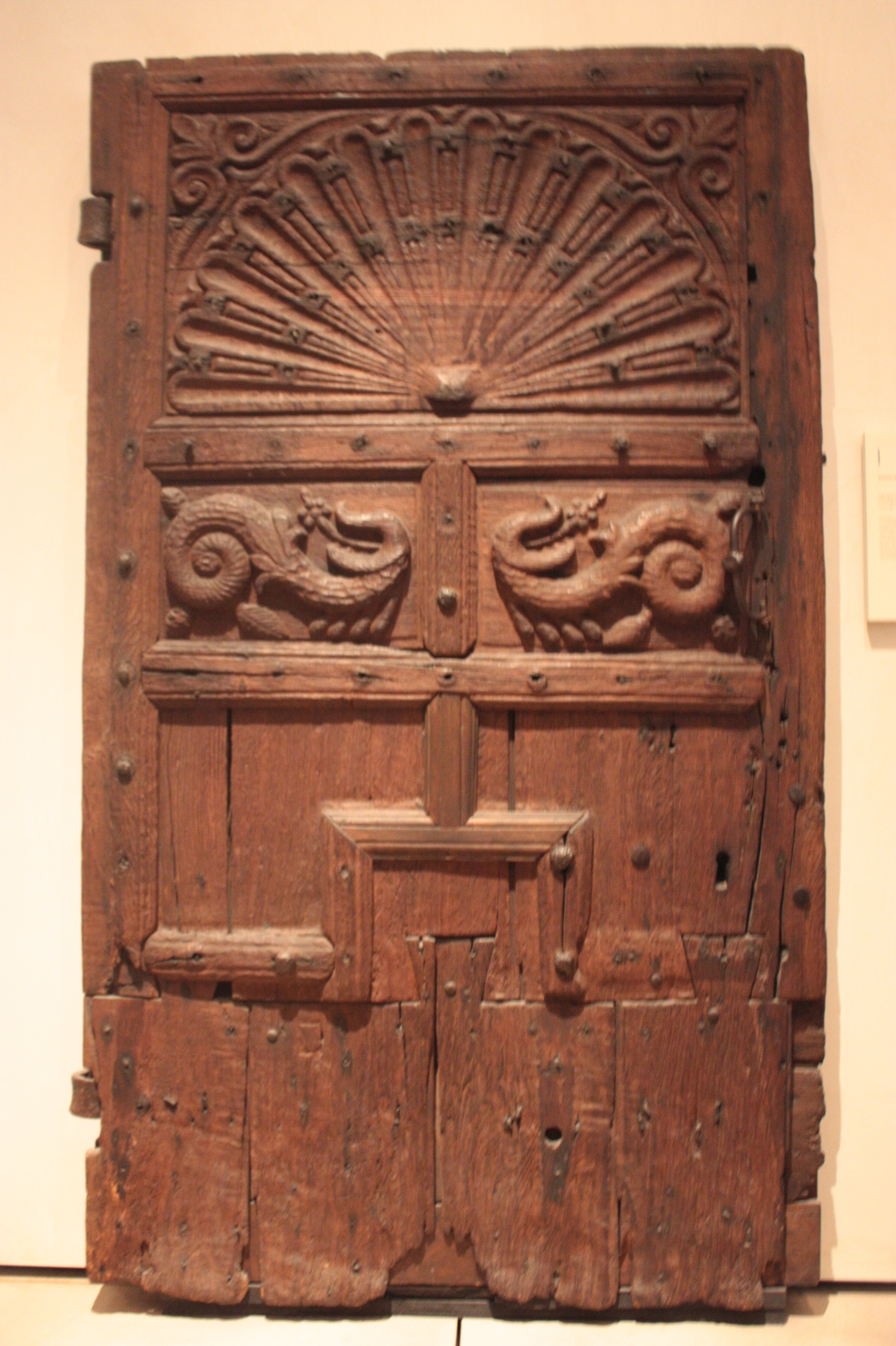
Door from Rowallan Castle, held by the National Museums of Scotland

James IV hung his bedchamber with scarlet velvet, some of this fabric was stolen in 1506. The tapestry used in Scottish royal palaces is well-documented. At Stirling Castle, in 1585, the king's "own hall" contained five pieces of tapestry with a dais (cloth of estate) of red damask fringed with gold, a cupboard, and a hanging chandelier of timber. Two suites of tapestry with five pieces were hanging in the palace at Stirling in 1578, the Triumph of Verity and the History of Roboam. Four pieces of the Hunts of the Unicorn were displayed in another room in 1578, and this suite was recreated by Historic Environment Scotland and weavers in association with West Dean College.

Some aristocrats owned tapestry in the 16th century, including George Gordon, 4th Earl of Huntly (died 1562) and John Stewart, 4th Earl of Atholl (died 1579), but detail and subjects were not recorded. At Dunnottar Castle, George Keith, 5th Earl Marischal had a suite of 'Samson' tapestries which may have represented his religious outlook. At Darnaway Castle in 1591, the bedchamber of James Stewart, 2nd Earl of Moray, the great hall, and the wall of the little hall behind the high table were hung with tapestry.

In 1617 King James returned to Scotland, bringing some furnishing for his palaces. An English writer George Gerrard noted a satirical comment,

all the old best hangings that were in this town (London) to be bought for love or money are sent thither, Nay, it is reported that in Germany the tapestry makers were intreated to make hangings that should look old, in order that Scotland might be thought to have had such household furniture of long time.

Records of commissions of new tapestry in the 1630s survive, including tapestries of Julius Caesar and Susannah and the Elders ordered by Walter Scott, 1st Earl of Buccleuch at The Hague. The Marquess of Montrose had several suites of tapestry at Mugdock Castle in 1669. These included the Story of Abraham, a suite of "forest work" or verdure, the Story of Josepeth, very old hangings brought from Kincardine Castle in 1659, "Arras work" hangings bought in 1662, and "lined hangings which are not of the finest". An Edinburgh merchant bought tapestries for Cawdor Castle in 1682, and they were carried from Oudenarde to Ghent and shipped to Dysart, to Leith, and finally to Findhorn. Tapestry at Drumlanrig in the 1690s included a set of six tapestries depicting scenes of the "Duke of Newcastle's Manadge", the manege or riding school at Bolsover Castle and Welbeck drawn by Abraham van Diepenbeeck, woven in Antwerp in the workshop of Michiel Wauters.

Some "Arras works" mentioned in inventories were a kind of patterned cloth used for bedcovers and wall hangings, which was relatively inexpensive compared with true tapestry, sometimes known as "Arras". Servais de Condé worked in Holyrood Palace for Mary, Queen of Scots in September 1561 lining a cabinet room with 26 ells of a fabric called "Paris Green". The Italian cloth merchant and financier Timothy Cagnioli advanced £500 Scots for the project. A cabinet room for James VI at Stirling Castle, a small space next to king's bedchamber in the palace, was also finished in green. The wealthy merchant John Clerk settled at Newbiggin House at Penicuik, and in 1665 ordered striped wall hangings from a weaver working in Edinburgh's Canongate, James Crommie or Crombie. Clerk had some worsted wool thread dyed carnation "in grain" for the hangings.

== Ceiling ornaments and carving ==
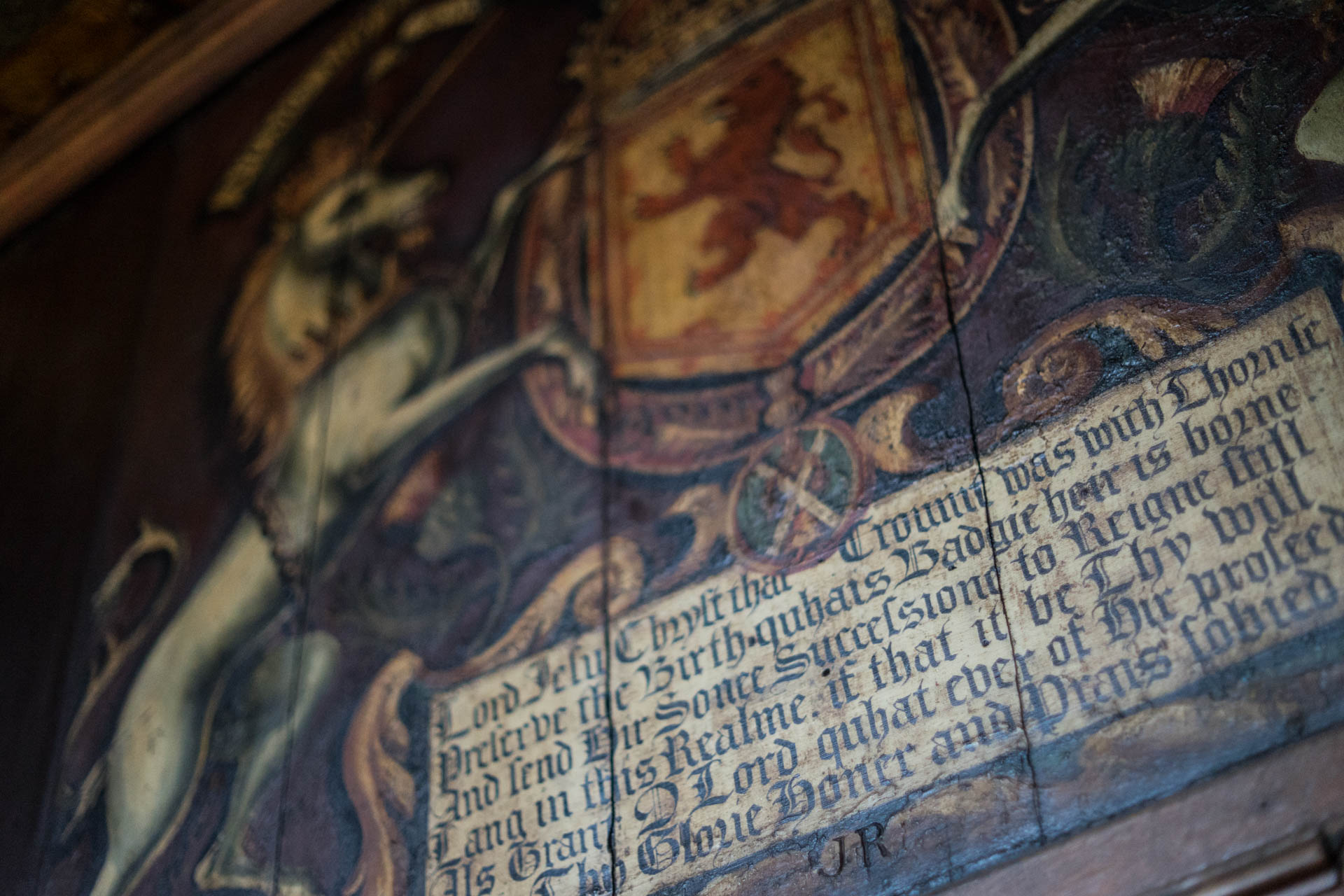
Heraldry at Edinburgh Castle painted in 1616/7 to commemorate the birth of James VI

The ceiling of a chamber in the palace at Stirling Castle was decorated in 1540 with carved roundels framing portraits of historical and legendary figures. The carving has traditionally been attributed to John Drummond of Milnab, and it is now thought a French craftsman Andrew Mansioun played a role in their creation. In the early 19th-century these "Stirling Heads" were dispersed among several collectors, and were drawn and published by Jane Ferrier (1767-1846) and Edward Blore with a list of the owners in Lacunar Strevelinse (Edinburgh, 1817). The carvings are now displayed at Stirling Castle (with three at the National Museum in Edinburgh), with carved and painted replicas in their approximate position.

Carved roundels with the coats of arms of Mary of Guise, Henry II of France, and Regent Arran decorated a house in Blythe's Close on the Castlehill, the upper stretch of the Royal Mile, in Edinburgh. It is thought the house may have been a lodging used by Mary of Guise. After the building was demolished in 1845, the Blythe's Close roundels were in the collection of Charles Kirkpatrick Sharpe, and then at Dunrobin Castle. They were acquired by the National Museums of Scotland in 2021. Perhaps in 1558, similar roundels were carved for the audience chamber of Holyrood Palace. These armorials were originally painted with bright colours using orpiment and azurite. No documentation survives to name the carvers of the Edinburgh armorials.

Decorative joinery and panelling of the 17th-century at Rowallan Castle included an internal porch or "portal door" which was relocated in the nearby new castle designed by Robert Lorimer. A courtyard door from Rowallan is held by the National Museum of Scotland.

According to an inventory of furniture and fixtures taken from the house of William Hamilton of Sanquhar, an associate of Regent Arran and Captain of Edinburgh Castle, in 1559 his woodwork was carved in the "courtly manner", and he had eight doors "with fine and raised work of the most recent and curious fashion used within the realm". This is probably a description of the French style of carving, still to be seen on examples of panelling at the National Museum of Scotland and the Stirling Smith Art Gallery and Museum, typically involving so-called Romayne medallion portraits. Nothing now remains of Hamilton's castle at Newton-on-Ayr.

== Craftsmen and merchants ==
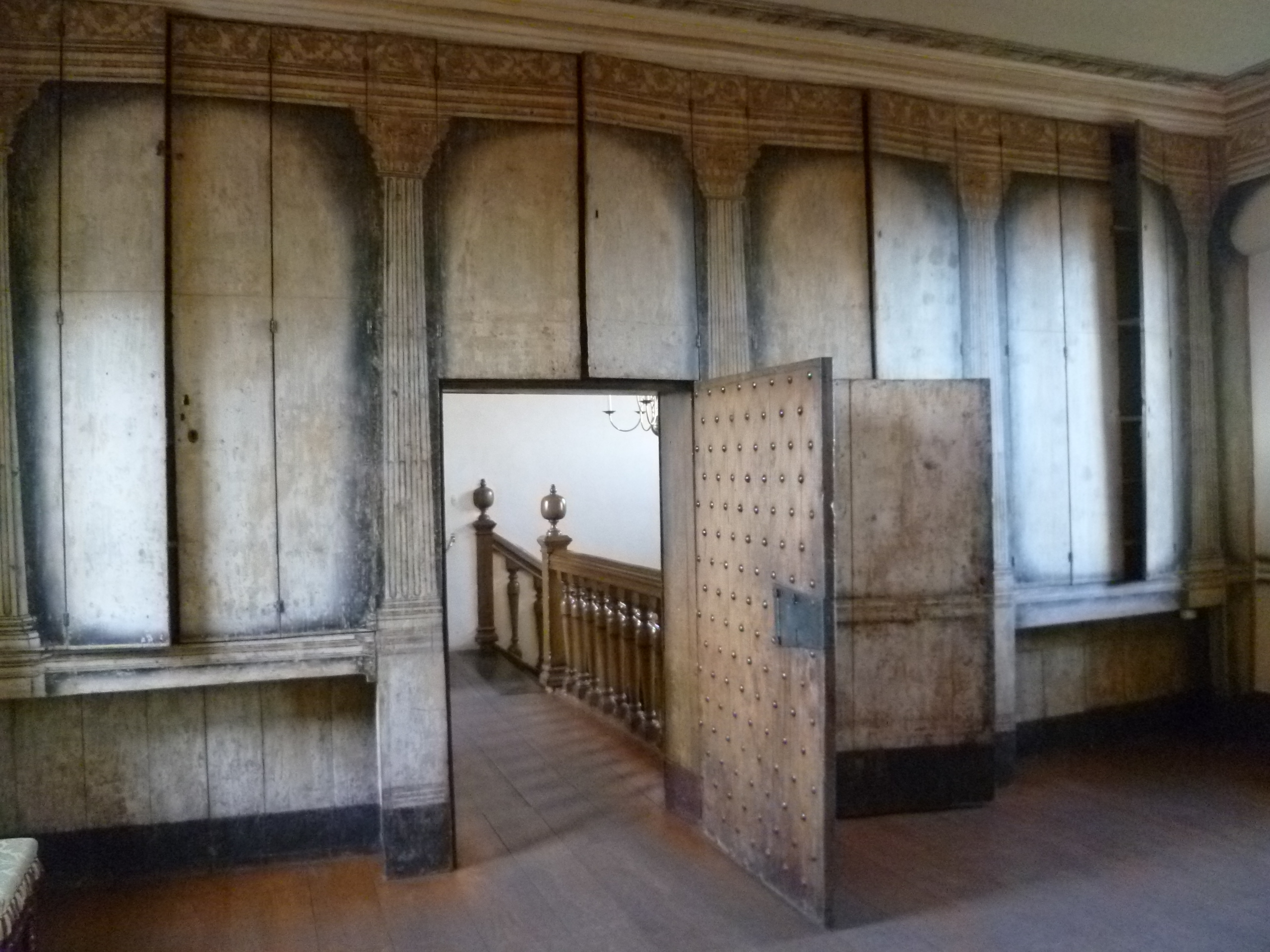
Original paintwork by David MacBeath from 1675 in the high dining room at Argyll's Lodging, Stirling concealing storage space.

Many purchases for the royal household were recorded in the accounts of the Lord Treasurer. James IV and Margaret Tudor bought textiles and tapestry in Flanders using the Edinburgh merchant James Hommyll, the Italian Jerome Frescobaldi, and others. A ledger kept by Andrew Halyburton records purchases he made for a variety of Scottish clients while he held the office of Conservator of the Scottish Staple at Veere. Sometimes commissioned imported goods were not paid for, and are mentioned as debts in the wills of merchants. A 17th-century merchant John Clerk left an extensive archive. He and his partners imported merchandise including furniture from France, some by commission. He also showed goods to aristocratic clients from his premises on Edinburgh High Street. Clerk's papers are now held by the National Archives of Scotland.

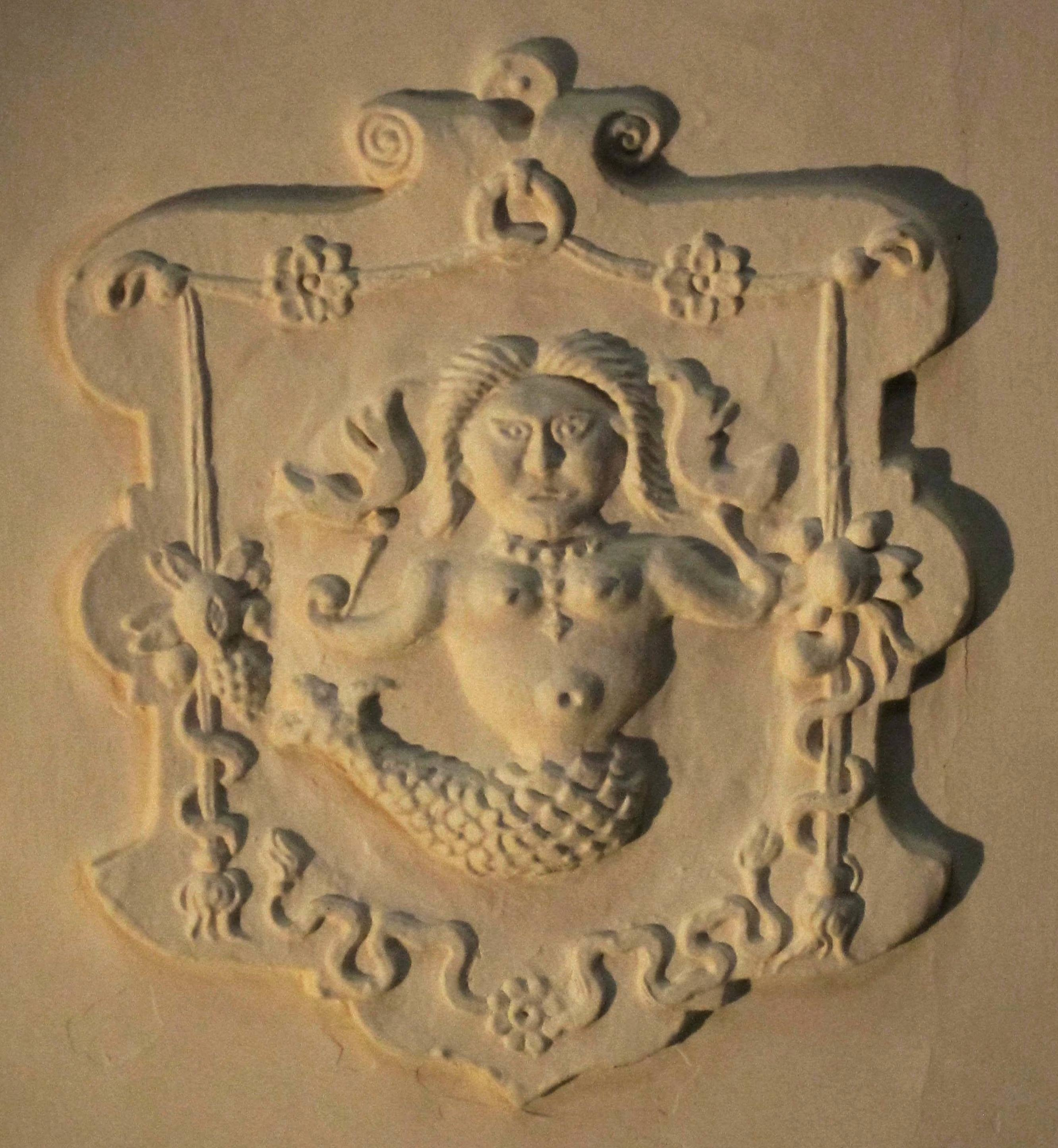
Plaster mermaid at Winton Castle, possibly made by John White c. 1630

The royal treasurer's accounts mention a number of craftsmen. Some furniture was made in Edinburgh Castle by the craftsmen who serviced the royal artillery. In September 1552 a wood-turner working in the castle made chair legs and bed posts (called "stoupis") for Regent Arran, and in October a wright called Harry Anderson was paid for glue for tables and beds made in Edinburgh castle. At least some of these tables were sent to Hamilton where the Regent was building a new lodging for himself. Mary, Queen of Scots had two French menusiers Nicolas Guillebault and Mathieu in her household. Guillebault was described as a valet de fourriére and menusier. His companion was Pierre Somville or Domville. Several payments in the treasurer's accounts show that his work involved upholstery. In October 1566 the menusier upholstered four chair and four folding stools with Morocco leather, and other stools, chairs, and stools of ease with velvet. These refurbishments were preparations for the Baptism of James VI. Anne of Denmark brought a Danish craftsman called "Frederick the turner" with her to Scotland in 1590 who remained in her household after the Union of the Crowns. He was later described as a locksmith.

=== Wrights and wood crafts in Scottish burgh towns ===
In the towns and burghs of Scotland, during the 15th-century, craftsmen formed incorporations or fraternities. These groups controlled the progression of apprentices into master craftsmen. Before the Scottish Reformation, the incorporations of crafts in Perth had altars in St John's Kirk. The wrights and barbers maintained an altar dedicated to "Our Lady of Pity". A craftsman who broke the rules would pay a fine in wax for the altar lights. They took part with other crafts in the annual pageants, plays, and processions at the feast of Corpus Christi. Newly selected craft masters paid for a banquet and a football match. The earliest surviving business records made by a Scottish furniture maker are 17th-century accounts and invoices drafted in a minute book of the Perth craft incorporation held by the National Library of Scotland.

In Edinburgh, furniture makers joined the Incoporation of Masons and Wrights. Entrants were obliged to make an apprentice piece, called an "essay" or "assay". Four masters of the craft judged each assays, including in 1555, the French carpenter Andrew Mansioun, John Cunningham, who like Mansioun was employed with royal artillery at Edinburgh Castle, and Patrick Schang who later worked on Edinburgh's "Maiden". The craft minutes for 1555 mention that Thomas Wod made a "drawin burde" (an extending table with leaves) and Thomas Kennedy who made a dresser cupboard.

=== Painted interiors ===
The treasurer's accounts mention a walnut bed and a walnut dining table made for James VI in April 1581 were painted. In December 1582, James VI commissioned a decorative painter, James Workman to make a board for playing the Game of the Goose.

Tapestry and wall hangings were complemented by painted friezes and ceilings, by artists including Walter Binning, Valentine Jenkin, and the Warkman family. In the 17th-century plaster ceilings and friezes become popular. Itinerant craftsmen used wooden moulds, and the same heads of the Nine Worthies can be seen at Balcarres House in Fife and Craigievar in Aberdeenshire. National motifs of thistles, harps, and Tudor roses appear on ceilings at Moubray House, at The Binns and elsewhere. John White or Quhyte, an English plasterer, worked at Winton Castle and The Hirsel, and was killed in an explosion at Dunglass Castle in 1640.

Stained-glass with coats of arms and other subjects were set in windows by craftsmen including Thomas Peebles. Window security was provided by grills called yetts. Yetts for the royal palaces were made by William Hill.
