= Scottish Renaissance painted ceilings =

Decorated ceilings in Scottish houses and castles

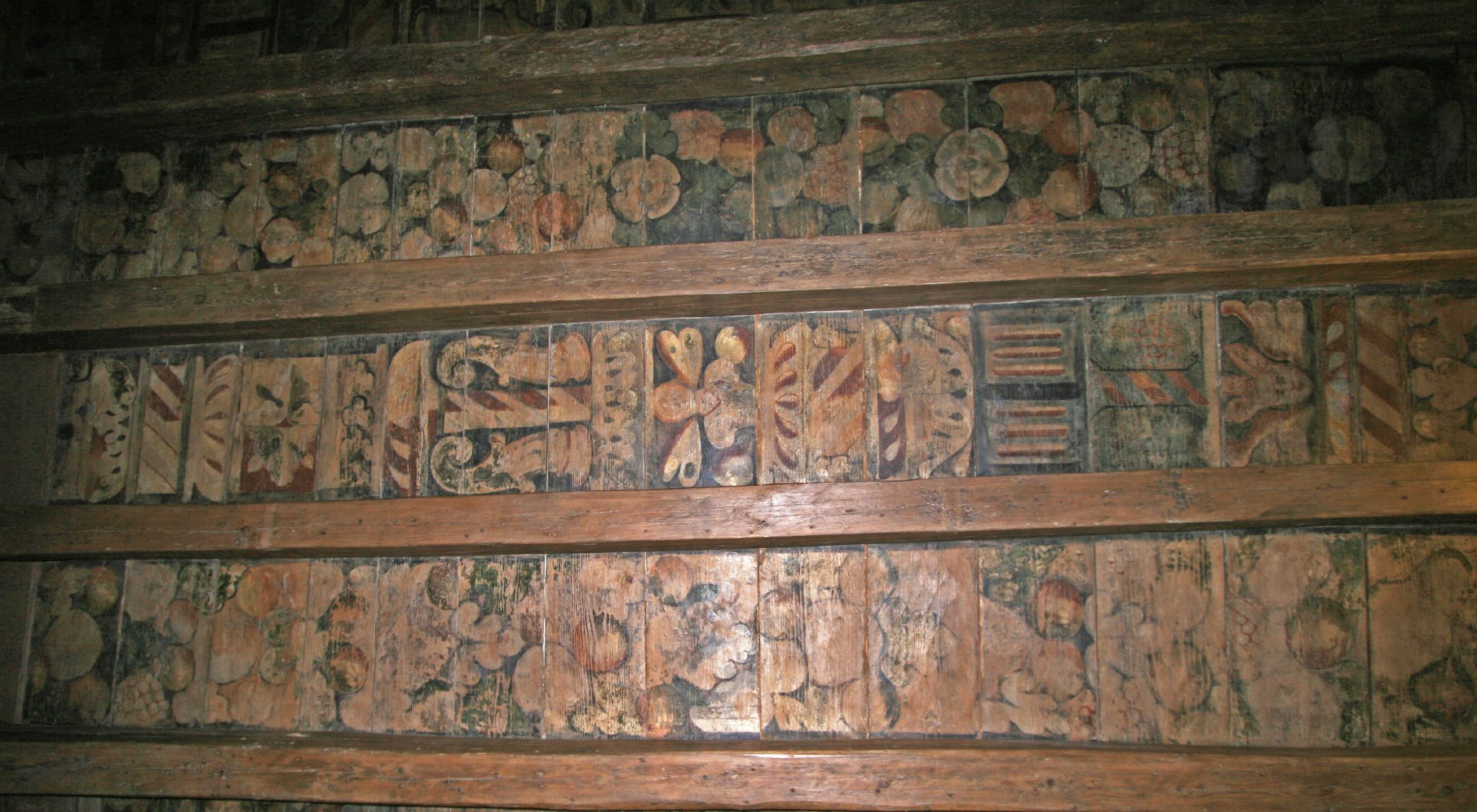
The 17th-century painted ceiling at Aberdour Castle, Fife

Scottish renaissance painted ceilings are decorated ceilings in Scottish houses and castles built between 1540 and 1640. This is a distinctive national style, though there is common ground with similar work elsewhere, especially in France, Spain and Scandinavia. An example in England, at Wickham, Hampshire, was recorded in 1974. There are records of over 100 examples, and a much smaller number of painted ceilings survive in-situ today. Some salvaged painted beams and boards are stored by Historic Environment Scotland. The paintings at Crathes Castle, dating from 1597 and 1602 are probably the best known.

== Imported timber ==
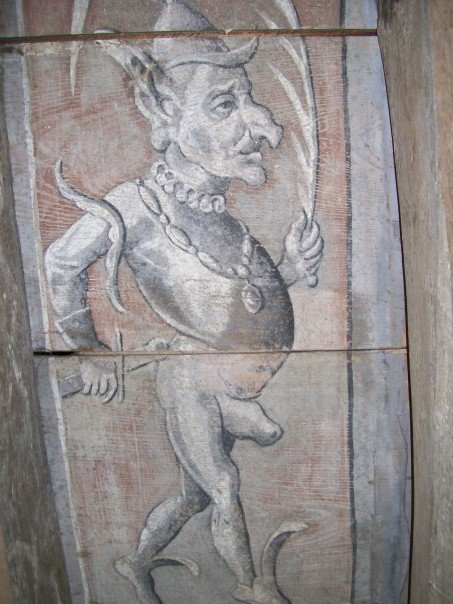
Figure from Prestongrange House, the ceiling is dated 1581

Most surviving examples are painted simply on the boards and joists forming the floor of the room above. Rooms or galleries in attic storeys were fully lined with thin pine boarding and painted. Oak and pine timber was imported from Denmark–Norway, Sweden, and further afield and known as "Eastland" timber. The fashion was superseded by decorative plasterwork and sometimes the painted ceilings were broken up to form lathing for the new plaster.

The house of the lawyer Sir Thomas Hope of Craighall, before it was demolished to build the public library in Edinburgh, had a large hall with a painted ceiling concealed above a moulded plasterwork ceiling, and the painted work could be seen by taking up the floorboards in the room above. The painted ceiling at Huntingtower Castle was hidden in the same manner until it was revealed by the Office of Works in 1912.

== Paint and painters ==
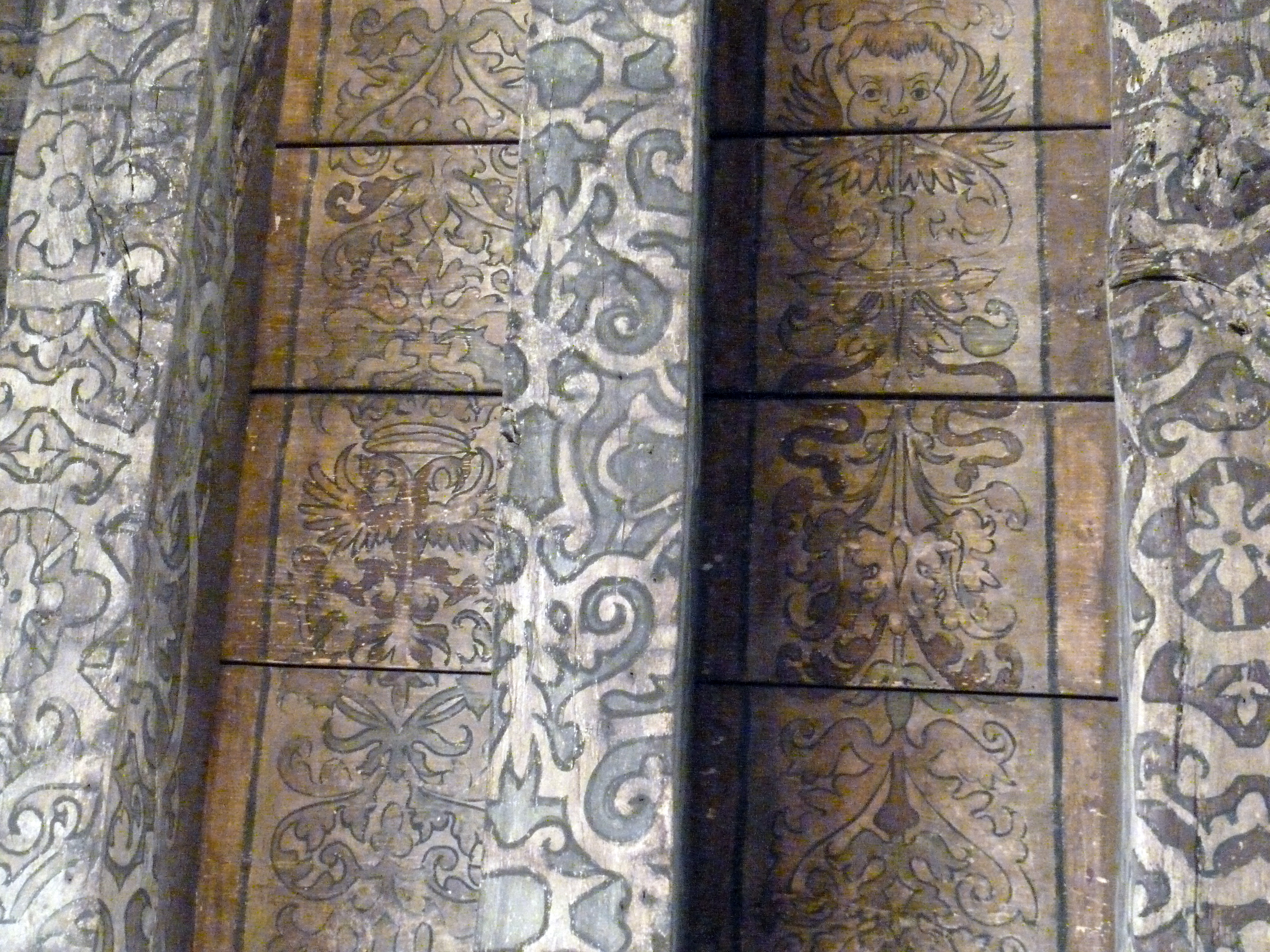
Ceiling with cherub's heads and an Imperial eagle and thistle motif at Riddle's Court

Technical research shows that the paint used protein size made from waste kid leather or parchment called "skrowis", with chalk and pigments, including red and yellow natural ochres, red vermilion, blue azurite, and orpiment often mixed with indigo to form vibrant greens. Brighter and more expensive pigments were needed for coats of arms. Pigment names used in 16th- and 17th-century Scotland can be found in the royal treasurer's accounts and the accounts of the masters of works, and in a small number of painter's wills in the National Records of Scotland. This information was collected by Michael R. Apted and Susan Hannabuss and published by the Scottish Record Society in 1978.

Some painters used a varnish made of pine resin and walnut oil on selected areas and colours of decoration. In England, a painter Leonard Fryer made an equivalent use of "sweet varnish" to enhance imitation wood graining at Oatlands Palace. The designs seem to have been painted freehand, excepting only motifs on ceiling boards at Riddle's Court which seemed to have been traced, perhaps by "pouncing" patterns.

The names of many painters have been found in contemporary records, but as yet no painter of any particular surviving ceiling has been identified through archival research. However, something is known of the painter craft in Edinburgh. In 1552 James Watson painted images of saints in his booth or workshop for the altarpiece of the Hammermen in St Giles, and painted and varnished the shields of the altar. In 1554, Edinburgh painters led by Walter Binning assaulted an outsider, David Warkman, who had been painting a ceiling. Painters and glaziers were linked in craft organisations in Scottish burghs, although the Scottish painters do not seem to have made and painted stained glass in this period.

Walter Binning painted the new north gallery of Holyrood Palace in 1577. Some of the Workman or Warkman family were settled at Burntisland in Fife the 1590s. The Skelmorlie Aisle at Largs was signed by John Stalker, and initials "IM" painted at Delgatie Castle may be those of the painter John Mellin or Melville. It appears that only the wealthiest of the merchant classes and aristocrats could afford this decoration, though the picture is unbalanced as more modest interiors do not survive.

The plastered walls or timber linings of the rooms were also painted, but this decoration has not usually survived. At the merchant's house in Law's Close, Kirkcaldy, a ship painted above a fireplace may represent the Angel of Kirkcaldy which was part of the fleet that brought James VI and Anne Denmark home in May 1590, or the James of Kirkcaldy, a ship part-owned by the Law family. At Riddle's Court in Edinburgh, painted decoration on plaster survived between the ends of the beams, and painted walls survive at Gladstone's Land.

== Types of patterns ==
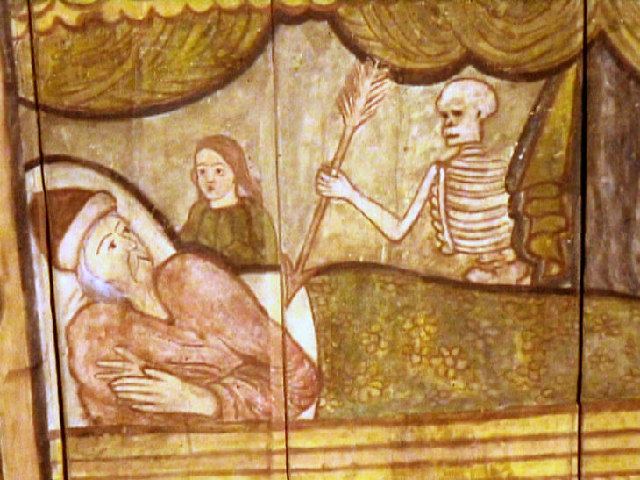
Death bed scene from the ceiling of St Mary's, Grandtully painted for William Stewart

The largest group of these ceilings have patterns of fruit and flowers, and may perhaps have evoked tapestry borders and include religious iconography. Some ceilings in galleries at the top of buildings incorporated vignettes with biblical or emblematic scenes. Others employ Renaissance grotesque ornament including symbolic emblems. A gallery in a demolished building on Edinburgh's Castlehill had scenes of the Apocalypse and Christ asleep in a storm, set in the Firth of Forth, with a backdrop of the Edinburgh Royal Mile skyline viewed from Fife. Fragments survive in storage at the National Museums of Scotland. Ceilings painted with rows of heraldic shields included; the gallery at Earlshall Castle and Collairnie Castle, Fife, a ceiling at Linlithgow High Street, and Nunraw House, East Lothian. Some 17th-century schemes included the signs of the zodiac. The summer house or banqueting room at Gowrie House, known at the Monk's Tower was updated with symbols from the zodiac and the heraldry of George Hay, 1st Earl of Kinnoull.

Several surviving examples can be seen in Edinburgh; including John Knox's House, Gladstone's Land, and the Canongate Tolbooth museum. The birthroom at Edinburgh Castle was painted by James Anderson to commemorate the fiftieth birthday of James VI, and restored by Walter Melville in 1693. Gladstone's Land, with a ceiling included a painted date of "1620", also has relatively well-preserved decoration on plaster contemporary with the ceilings. More extensive domestic mural painting survives at Kinneil House, dating from the 1550s, and painted for the Regent Arran, who employed Walter Binning on some of his projects. Aberdour Castle, Fife, has one of latest ceilings c.1633, and Huntingtower Castle the earliest c.1540. Ceilings at Crathes Castle are decorated with the Nine Worthies and the Muses. As at Crathes, beams at Traquair House and Sailor's Walk, Kirkcaldy, carry proverbial and biblical admonitions, written in Middle Scots. A gallery at Provost Skene's House, Aberdeen, is similar in format to the Castlehill painting, St. Mary's, Grandtully, and the Skelmorlie Aisle at Largs, two examples in churches, are painted on the thin lining boards of wooden barrel vaults. Culross Palace, built by Sir George Bruce of Carnock, has a variety of painted interiors including suites of emblems, geometric patterns and biblical scenes.

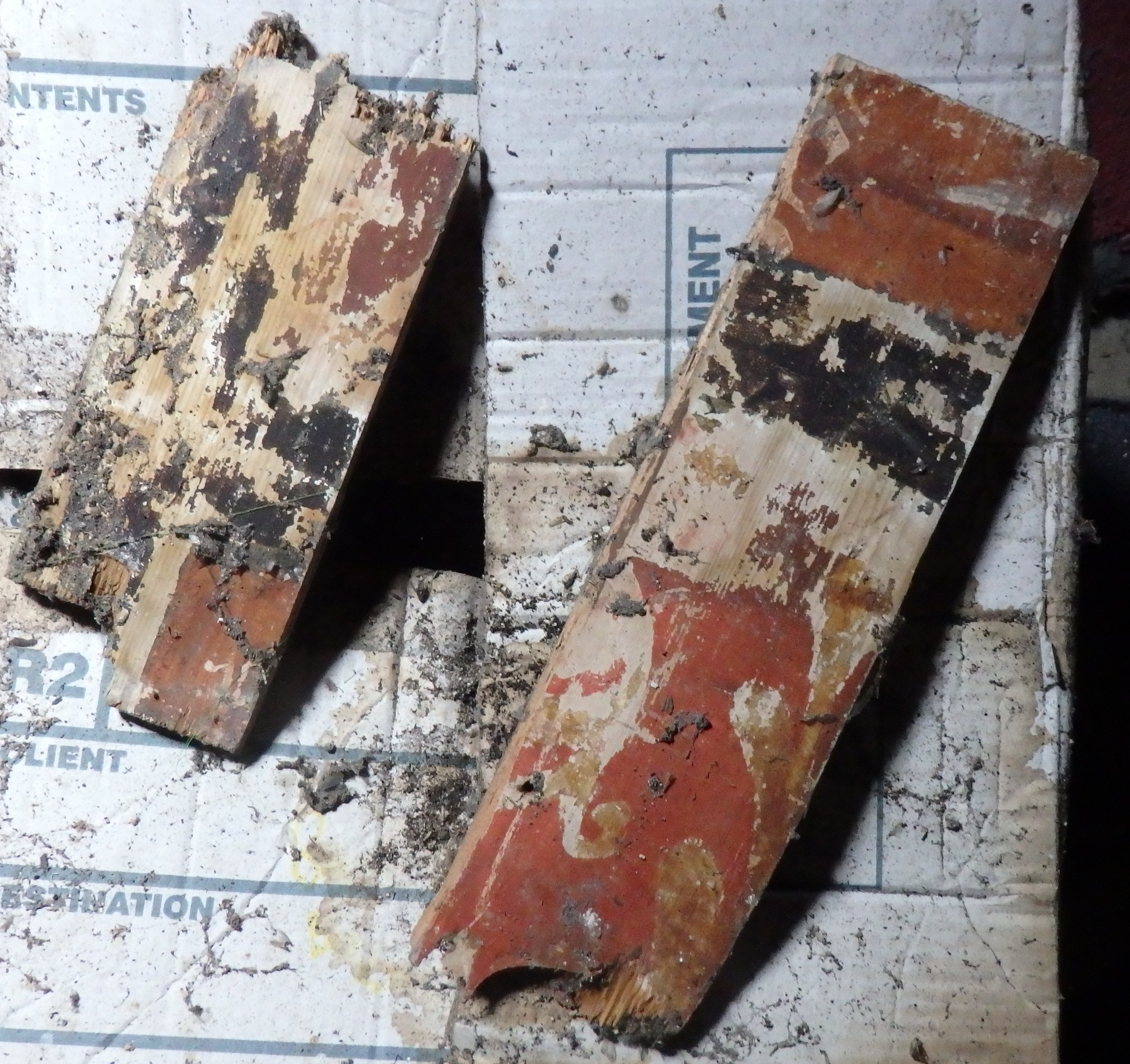
Fragments of painted pine boards from a ceiling at Keith Marischal, East Lothian

Other ceilings remain in private buildings, and a number of ceilings were salvaged and stored by Historic Scotland including two from Dysart, Fife. The National Museum of Scotland displays a ceiling from Rossend Castle, Burntisland, Fife, and a screen from Wester Livilands, near Stirling. Stirling Smith Museum and Art Gallery has a ceiling from Robert Drummond of Carnock's house. A room from Alexander Seton, 1st Earl of Dunfermline's Pinkie House is displayed at the Museum of Edinburgh. Painted beams from Midhope Castle were moved to Abbey Strand, Edinburgh, and a ceiling from Prestongrange House is at Merchiston Tower, though these last two are not regularly open to the public. Two rooms in the G&V Hotel in Edinburgh still have painted ceilings from the original early seventeenth century tenement building on the Lawnmarket.

Painted ceilings concealed by later plasterwork continue to be discovered or rediscovered. Fragments of a ceiling made for George Keith, 5th Earl Marischal survive at Keith Marischal. A ceiling with grotesques and scrollwork "of exceptional quality" was found at Moubray House on Edinburgh's Royal Mile in 1999. After restoration the whole building was pledged as a gift to Historic Scotland by an American benefactor in 2012. Another ceiling on Edinburgh's Royal Mile was discovered in 2010 in Clement Cor's house in Advocate's Close. A part of the ceiling was varnished with pine resin. The joints in the floorboards had been sealed with paper tape.

== Sources of the designs ==
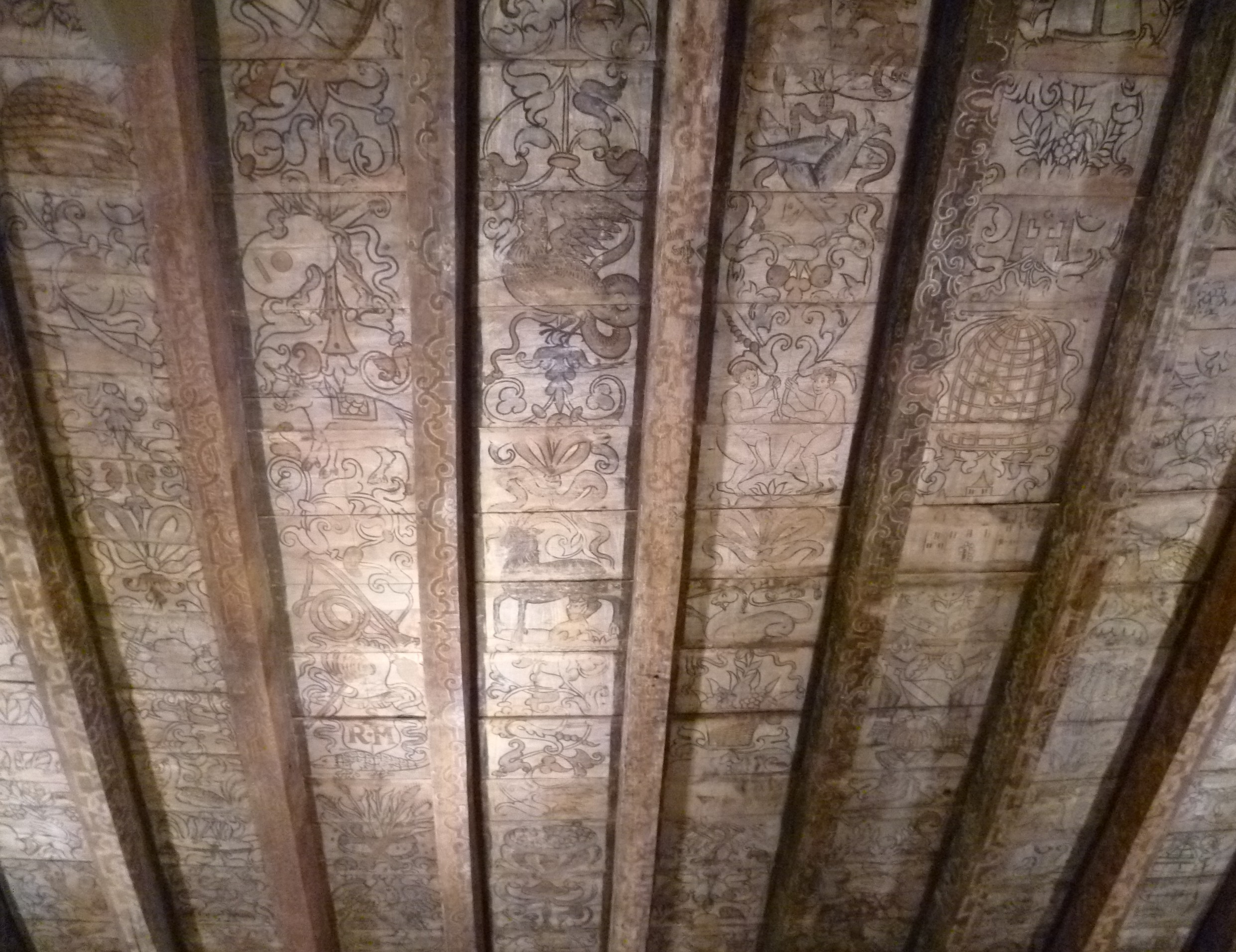
Ceiling from Rossend Castle, Burntisland, in the National Museum of Scotland, painted for Sir Robert Melville of Murdocairney with emblems taken from Claude Paradin

Some of the ceilings include pictures or emblems based on European printed books. These were very much part of elite culture in Scotland, in 1584 the poet William Fowler told a German traveller Lupold von Wedel that he was teaching James VI and I the art of memory, and Fowler later noted that the king had taught him poetry and imprese at the same time. In July 1593 William Dundas of Fingask wrote from Edinburgh to Sir Robert Cecil in London, saying that he had heard Cecil was completing a gallery and would like paintings with "such toyis" as he had seen himself in Scotland. Dundas seems to have sent Cecil a present of sketches, presumably of emblematic devices.

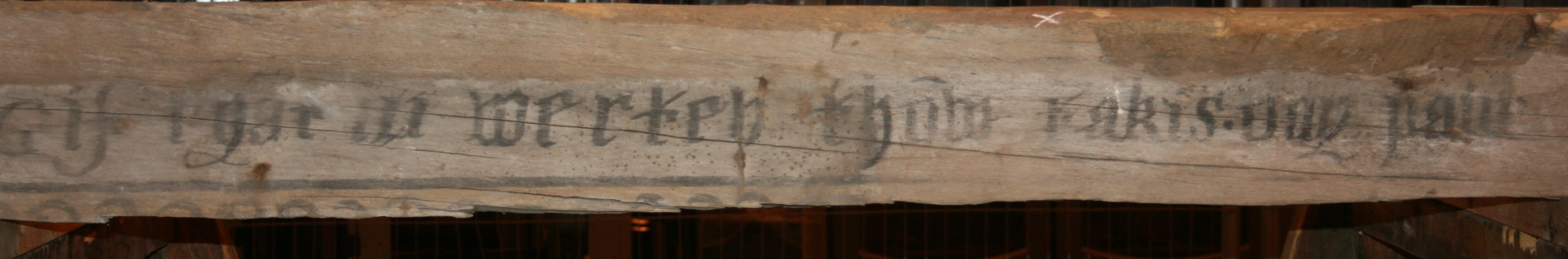
Painted beam from Carnock House Stirlingshire

Prestongrange's ceiling painted for Mark Kerr and Helen Leslie in 1581 has comic figures from Richard Breton's Les songes drolatiques de Pantagruel, Paris (1565). Nicolas Elphinstone gave James VI a copy of this book, and there was another in the library of Adam Bothwell, Bishop of Orkney who died in 1593. Other ornaments were taken from 17 engravings after Hans Vredeman de Vries called the Grottesco, printed by Gerard de Jode in Antwerp (1565–71), and from the Caryatidum depicting architectural 'terms' - load bearing figures. The ceiling is dated 1581 and at that time complimented a sideboard gifted by Esmé Stuart. This ceiling was moved to the tower of Merchiston Castle for Napier University.

At Rossend Castle (now in the National Museum of Scotland), emblems by Claude Paradin, Gabriele Simeoni and Alciato were used, again with ornamental detail from Vredeman de Vries's Grottesco, with devices of European princes. A ceiling at Riddle's Court in Edinburgh has the eagle of the Holy Roman Empire combined with a thistle, perhaps to commemorate the visit of the Duke of Holstein in 1598.

Inscriptions on beams salvaged from Carnock House, Stirlingshire, the oak timber dated to 1589 by dendrochronology, include stoic advice in Scots from Gaius Musonius Rufus (possibly via the English author William Baldwin) with Biblical proverbs. Emblems at Culross Palace were adapted from A Choice of Emblems by Geffrey Whitney, (London, 1586). The tiny engravings made by the French goldsmith Etienne Delaune supplied the ornament at the Skelmorlie Aisle. Amongst the sources used at Pinkie were de Vries's Perspectiva, (1605), Otto van Veen's Emblemata Horatiana, Antwerp (1607), and Denis de Lebey de Batilly's Emblemata (Frankfurt, 1596). These demonstrate the use of renaissance pattern books by painters and patrons in Scotland, and coupled with copious classical quotations, the wealth and topicality of the library of Alexander Seton.

== Conservation and critical literature ==
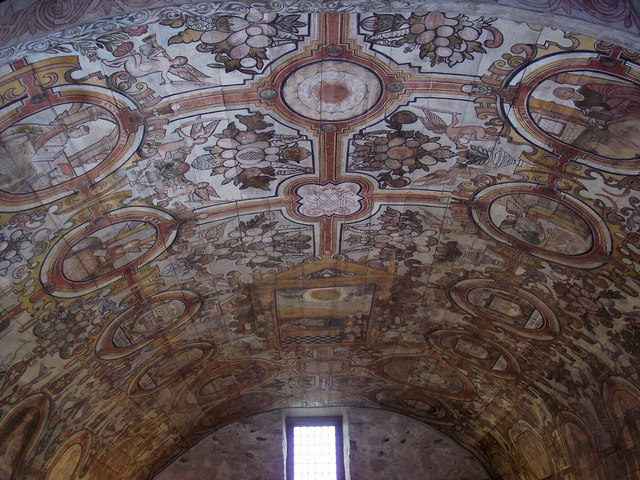
Painted wooden vault at Grandtully Chapel

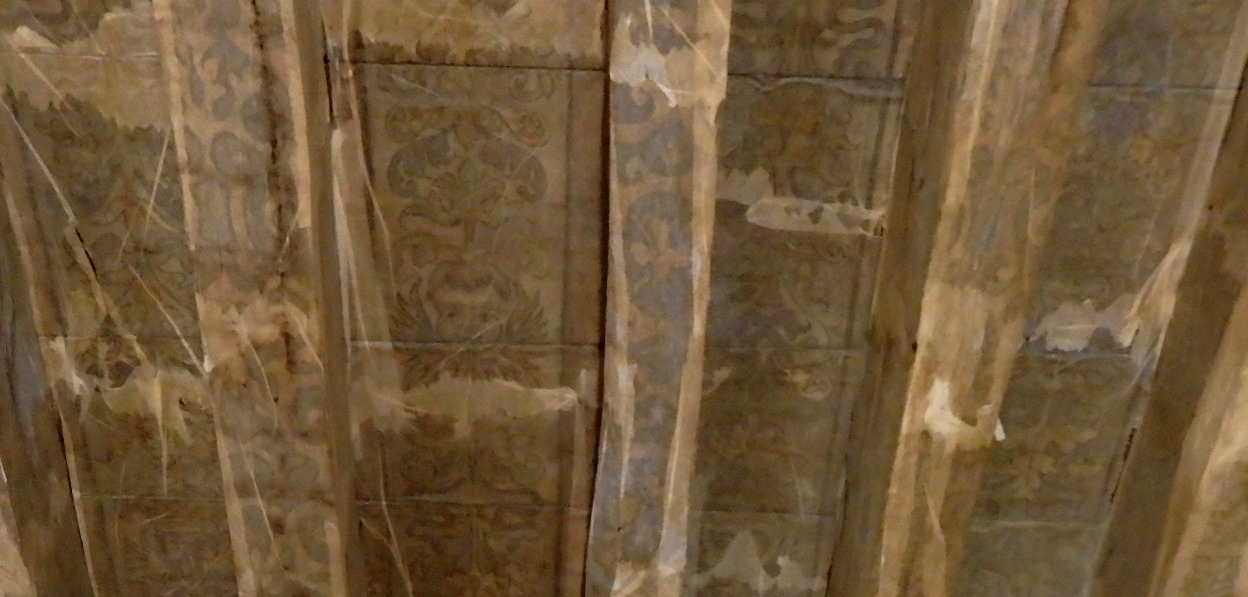
Conservation of 1590s painting at Riddle's Court, Edinburgh, in 2015. The ceiling is "faced up" with Japanese tissue and new size medium is applied to consolidate the delicate and fragile paintwork

Apart from William Dundas' letter of 1593, there are no contemporary references to this type of decoration. The lawyer John Lauder, Lord Fountainhall saw the painted emblems in the gallery at Pinkie in the 1680s and thought them pedantic. In 1746, an English soldier, James Ray, viewed the ruins of Huntly Castle and commented on ceilings, still decorated with "history-painting".

Most examples were concealed behind later interiors or neglected in buildings which became lower status accommodation. In the early nineteenth century antiquarian interest was kindled by discovery during the demolition of buildings in Edinburgh and Dundee. Charles Kirkpatrick Sharpe and Rev. Sime rescued a part of the Apocalypse painting from Edinburgh's Castlehill and made a series of coloured record drawings now held by the Historic Environment Scotland. Daniel Wilson described the ceiling in his Memorials of Edinburgh. At the end of the century, Andrew Lyons, artist and antiquarian, made drawings of a number of ceilings (also held by HES/RCAHMS), and published articles in the Proceedings of the Society of Antiquaries, Scotland, PSAS.

Modern conservation of painted ceilings in Scotland can be said to have begun at Huntingtower in 1912. Frank Baines the supervising architect from the Office of Works sought advice from the expert chemist Arthur Pillans Laurie of Heriot-Watt University in 1912. He advised using a weak solution of gelatine to fix the flaking paint pigment. In the first half of the twentieth century conservation works were led by John Houston of the Ministry of Works. The National Trust for Scotland and the Ministry of Works set up a centre at Stenhouse in 1965 to specialise in the conservation of these paintings. Conservators Ian Hodkinson and Rab Snowden, and Michael R. Apted, an inspector of ancient monuments, were instrumental in the rescue and salvage of a number of painted ceilings, published in Apted's 1966 monograph, and a series of PSAS articles. Apted made an exhaustive search of archive references to painters and painting for his Edinburgh PhD thesis, and this formed the basis for his collaboration with Susan Hannabuss, Painters in Scotland: A Biographical Dictionary published in 1978. John Cornforth admired the contribution of the Stenhouse Conservation Centre as antiquarian and romantic.

More recently, Michael Bath, emeritus professor of English, Strathclyde University, has re-assessed the corpus with a particular focus on the emblems used and their origins and meanings to the Scottish patrons. Bath has published a number of articles and a detailed illustrated 2003 monograph exploring sources with a useful comprehensive inventory of examples both extant and destroyed. Ailsa Murray's 2009 article and Chantal‐Helen Thuer's 2011 report and explore conservation methods. Michael Bath, Anne Crone and Michael Pearce (2017) reflected on Anne Crone's dendrochronogy work on the salvaged timbers stored by Historic Environment Scotland. Fern Insh writes on religious connections in the imagery and the patrons who commissioned these works. In 2018 Michael Bath revisited emblems and symbolism making new connections.

== See also ==
- Domestic furnishing in early modern Scotland
- Scottish Royal tapestry collection

== Bibliography by date ==
- Andrew Jervise, "Poetical Maxims from an old house at Culross", in Proceedings of the Society of Antiquaries of Scotland, vol. 2, (1854–57), 339–344. doi:10.9750/PSAS.002.339.344
- Andrew Jervise, "Painted Room at Earlshall", in Proceedings of the Society of Antiquaries of Scotland, vol. 4, (1860–62), 387–91. doi:10.9750/PSAS.004.387.391
- T. Etherington Cook, "Notice of heraldic ceiling found in Linlithgow2, in Proceedings of the Society of Antiquaries Scotland, vol. 7, (1866–68), 409-413
- Thomas Bonnar & George Waterston junior, in Edinburgh Architectural Association Sketchbook, vol. iii, 1880–82, coloured print of Culross Palace.
- George Seton, Proceedings of the Society of Antiquaries of Scotland, vol. 22, (1887–88), 10-23, 'Notice of the Gallery at Pinkie House'
- William Dobie, The Skelmorlie Aisle, (repr. from 1847), Archaeological Collections ... Ayrshire and Galloway, vi, Edinburgh (1889)
- Daniel Wilson, Memorials of Edinburgh in the Olden Time, vol. i, (1891), 194-201
- Thomas Ross, Proceedings of the Society of Antiquaries (PSAS), vol. 33 (1898–99), 387–403, "Sibyls at Wester Livilands" (PDF).
- Andrew S Lyons, PSAS, vol. 35, (1900–01), 109–11, "Montgomery Aisle at Largs" (PDF). Skelmorlie Aisle
- Andrew S Lyons, PSAS, vol. 38 (1903–04), 151–172, "Tempera painting in Scotland" (PDF)., this pdf concludes with a newspaper cutting re. Old Gala House.
- Andrew S. Lyons, "Further Notes on Tempera-Painting in Scotland, and other Discoveries at Delgaty Castle", PSAS, vol. 44 (1909–10), 237-59
- J. S. Richardson, "Mural Decorations at Kinneil", PSAS, vol. 75, (1941), 184–204. doi:10.9750/PSAS.075.184.204
- A. Graham, PSAS, vol. 77 (1942–43), 147–154, "The Painted Ceiling in Grandtully Church" (PDF). Archived from the original (PDF) on 23 May 2012.
- David McRoberts, 'Provost Skene’s House in Aberdeen and its Catholic Chapel,' Innes Review, vol.5 pt.2, (1954) 119–124.
- Michael R. Apted, PSAS, vol. 91 (1957–58), 144–176, "Two painted ceilings from Mary Somerville's House, Burntisland, Fife" (PDF).
- Edward Meldrum, PSAS, vol. 92 (1958–59), "Sir George Skene's House in the Guestrow, Aberdeen" (PDF).
- Michael Apted, The painted ceilings of Scotland (HMS0, 1966).
- Michael Apted & W Norman Robertson, "Two painted ceilings from Rossend Castle, Burntisland, Fife", PSAS, 104 (1972), 222–235, doi:10.9750/PSAS.104.222.235
- Michael R. Apted & W. Norman Robertson, "Four 'drollities' from Prestongrange, East Lothian", PSAS, vol. 106 (1977), 158–160. doi:10.9750/PSAS.106.158.160
- Duncan Thomson, Painting in Scotland 1570–1650, National Galleries of Scotland (1975), 42-49
- Michael R. Apted & Susan Hannabuss, Painters in Scotland, 1301-1700: a biographical dictionary (Edinburgh, SRS & Edina Press, 1978).
- Sheila MacKay ed., Scottish Renaissance Interiors (Edinburgh: Moubray House NTS/HHA, 1987)/
- John Cornforth, Three decades of discovery, Country Life, 6 January 1994, 34-6
- Michael Bath, Renaissance decoration in Scotland, NMS, (2003), ISBN 1-901663-60-4.
- William Kay, in The Building Conservation Directory (2006), "Restoring the magic to Law's Close, Kirkcaldy". re-published by buildingConservation.com
- Michael Bath, "Was there a Guise Palace in Edinburgh?", in Robert Gowing and Robyn Pender, eds., All Manner of Murals: The History, Techniques and Conservation of Secular Wall Paintings (London: Archetype, 2007).
- Michael Bath, "Ben Jonson, William Fowler & the Pinkie Ceiling", in Architectural Heritage, 18, (2007),73–86. doi:10.3366/arch.2007.18.1.73
- Ailsa Murray, eConservation Magazine, 10, (2009) "Scottish Renaissance Timber Painted Ceilings". Archived from the original on 10 July 2011.
- Ailsa Murray, "Scottish Renaissance Painting Ceilings and the Stirling Heads Project", Polychrome Wood (London, 2010), pp. 177–192.
- Michael Pearce, 'Paint', in Moses Jenkins (ed.), Building Scotland (John Donald, 2010), pp. 91–103, ISBN 978-0-85976-710-1.
- Michael Bath, Journal of the Northern Renaissance 2.1 (Spring 2010), "Andrew Bairhum, Giovanni Ferrerio and the 'lighter style of painting'".
- Chantal‐Helen Thuer, Scottish Renaissance Interiors: Facings and adhesives for size‐tempera painted wood, (Historic Scotland, 2011).
- Fiona Allardyce & Karen Dundas, "Strange Bedfellows: Two Early-Seventeenth-Century Painted Ceilings and a Painted Plaster Panel at 302–304 Lawnmarket in Edinburgh's Old Town", Historic Environment: Policy and Practice, 2 (2011), 5–20. doi:10.1179/175675011X12943261434521
- A. Crone & D. Sproat, 'Revealing the History, timber-framed building at No 302 Lawnmarket Edinburgh' in Journal of Architectural Heritage Society of Scotland, 22 (EUP 2012), 19–36.
- Fern Insh, 'Recusants and the Rosary: A Seventeenth-Century Chapel in Aberdeen' (Provost Skene's House), in Recusant History, 31:2 (2012), 195–218. doi:10.1017/S0034193200013571
- Michael Pearce, "Riddle's Court", in History Scotland, 12:4 (July/August 2012), pp. 20–27.
- Michael Bath, Journal of the Northern Renaissance 5 (Spring 2013), "Philostratus comes to Scotland a new source for the pictures at Pinkie".
- Fern Insh, 'From Relegation to Elevation: The Viewer's Relationship with Painted Ceilings from the Medieval to Renaissance Eras in North-East Scotland', in Jane Geddes, Medieval Art, Architecture and Archaeology in the Dioceses of Aberdeen and Moray (Routledge, 2016)
- Michael Bath, Anne Crone, Michael Pearce, The Dendrochronology and Art History of 16th and 17th century Painted Ceilings (Historic Environment Scotland, 2017).
- Michael Pearce, 'Painted Decoration, Making and Context', Jennifer Melville, Gladstone's Land (Edinburgh: National Trust for Scotland, 2018), pp. 256–288.
- Michael Bath, Emblems in Scotland: Motifs and Meanings (Brill: Leiden, 2018).
- Lauren Murdoch, "By craftsman's arte: theology and decorative practice in Scottish ecclesiastical and domestic buildings, 1560-1639", University of Edinburgh, PhD thesis, 2021
- Karen Dundas, "Painted ceilings: their significance on the Royal Mile and wider context", Michael Cressey, 'Riddle's Court, Lawnmarket, Edinburgh: a merchant's house fit for a king, Scottish Archaeological Internet Reports, 102 (2023), pp. 43–52 doi:10.9750/issn.2056-7421.2023.102
