= Rossend Castle =

Building in Fife, Scotland

Coordinates: 56°3′31.4″N 3°14′25.0″W

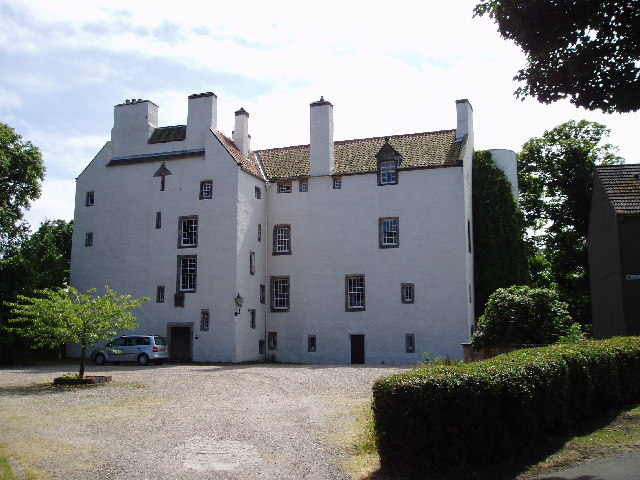
Rossend Castle

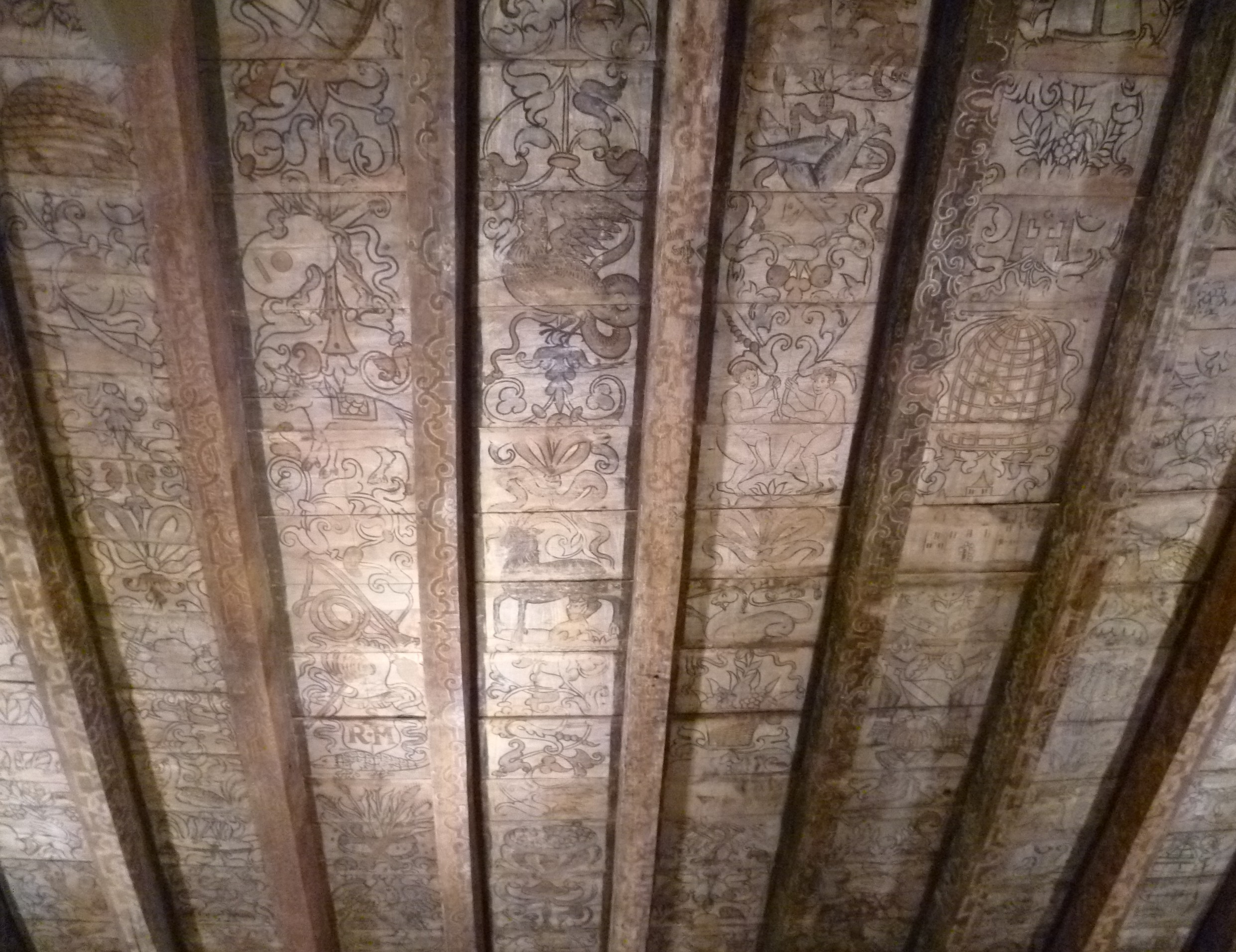
Painted ceiling from the castle preserved in the National Museum of Scotland

Rossend Castle is a historic building in Burntisland, a town on the south coast of Fife, Scotland.

== History ==
A keep, known as the Tower of Kingorne Wester, was in existence on the site from 1119. It was later referred to as Burntisland Castle, and by 1382 was called Abbot's Hall, as it was the home of the Abbot of Dunfermline. The present building is largely of the 16th century, though with a 13th-century basement, which contains lancet windows and may represent the remains of a chapel. It was rebuilt by Peter Durie of Durie from 1552, and the arms of Abbot George Durie, and the date 22 May 1554, appear over the main door.

During the war of the Rough Wooing the English soldier John Luttrell landed at Burntisland on 28 December 1547. He burnt boats and buildings at the pier, and the owners of Rossend surrendered the castle to him.

Mary, Queen of Scots, visited during her short personal reign (1561–1567). On 14 February 1562, the French messenger and poet Chastelard was discovered hiding under Mary's bed in the castle.

On 11 May 1590 Sir Robert Melville hosted the Danish Admiral Peder Munk who was travelling to Falkland Palace to take possession of the lands granted to Anne of Denmark as part of her dowry.

In April 1594 James VI came to Rossend from Leith with his guard, and unsuccessfully tried to capture two rebel supporters of the Earl of Bothwell, Archibald Wauchope of Niddrie and John Wemyss of Logie. Probably in the first decades of the 17th-century, Sir Robert Melville commissioned a painted timber ceiling. The scheme includes his initials "SRM" which he used as a seal on his letters, and pictorial emblems copied from the Devises Heroïques of Claude Paradin and other print sources. The ceiling may have been part of a redecoration of the castle in 1617, when King James planned to visit during his "salmon-like" return to Scotland. Melville was instructed to make "his house of Burntyland patent" for his majesty's reception. One of the documented Scottish painters of the period, James Workman, lived in Burntisland.

The castle was captured in 1651 by the soldiers of Oliver Cromwell, and in the later 17th century it was owned by the Wemyss family, who remodelled the top floor.

By 1765, it was owned by Murdoch Campbell, a Highlander from Skye, who probably gave the building its current name.

In 1915 Thomas Ross was arrested whilst studying the castle, for sketching in a prohibited area, and fined five shillings.

The castle was acquired by the Town Council in 1952. In 1957, the Scottish renaissance painted ceilings was discovered and is now displayed in the National Museum of Scotland in Edinburgh. The council threatened to demolish the property, which had been allowed to deteriorate, but it was saved after a public inquiry in 1972. In 1975, the castle was bought by the architecture firm Robert Hurd & Partners, who restored it and retain the building as their offices. It is a category B listed building.

It was bought in 2019 by private owners who have restored it

== See also ==
- Restoration of castles in Scotland
