= Michael R. Apted =

Michael Ross Apted (died 2002) was an English archaeologist who worked as an Inspector of Ancient Monuments in Scotland, Wales and England.

Michael Apted was educated at Wadham College, Oxford. He worked with the Archaeological Survey of Egypt at the rock tomb of Pepyankh Henykem, Meir. In Scotland, as an Inspector of Ancient Monuments, he was involved in the salvage and rescue of several renaissance painted ceilings. He researched their context and archival records for his 1964 University of Edinburgh PhD thesis, "Painting in Scotland from the 14th to the 17th Centuries with Particular Reference to Painted Domestic Decoration, 1550–1650". In Wales, he was involved in the adoption of the Bryntail lead mine into state care.

== Selected publications ==
- (With Susan Hannabuss), A biographical dictionary of painters in Scotland 1301–1700 (Edinburgh: SRS and Edina, 1978).
- "The 17th-century Buildings at Tredegar House", in M. R. Apted, Gilyard-Beer & Saunders (eds.), Ancient Monuments and their Interpretation: Essays Presented to A. J. Taylor (Pillimore, 1977).
- (With W. Norman Robertson), "Four 'drollities' from Prestongrange, East Lothian", PSAS, 106 (1977) 158–160. doi:10.9750/PSAS.106.158.160
- "Social conditions at Tredegar House", Monmouthshire Antiquary , 3 (1973), 125–55
- The painted ceilings of Scotland (HMS0, 1966).
- "Two painted ceilings from Mary Somerville's House, Burntisland, Fife", Proceedings of the Society of Antiquaries Scotland, 91 (1958), 144–176. doi:10.9750/PSAS.091.144.176
- (With Aylward M. Blackman), The Rock Tombs of Meir, ASE 28 & 29 (London: EES, 1952).
