= Michael Bath (academic) =

Michael Bath is an academic and author specialising in English literature and history. He is an emeritus professor of the University of Strathclyde and a senior research fellow at the University of Glasgow.

Michael Bath studied at Keble College, Oxford. Bath taught English literature at the University of Strathclyde. He was joint founder and a chairman of the Society for Emblem Studies and a co-editor of the journal Emblematica. His published work explores symbolism and transmission of meaning in poetry and renaissance material culture.

== Publications ==
- (with Tom Furniss), Reading Poetry:A Complete Coursebook, 3rd edition (Routledge, 2022).
- Emblems in Scotland: Motifs and Meanings (Brill, Leiden, 2018).
- (with Theo Van Heijnsbergen), "Paradin Politicized: Some New Sources for Scottish Paintings", Emblematica, 22 (2016), pp. 43–67.
- (with Malcolm Jones), "Placardes and Billis and Ticquettis of Defamatioun: Queen Mary, the Mermaid and the Hare", Journal of the Warburg and Courtauld Institutes, 78:1 (2015), pp. 223–246. doi:10.1086/JWCI26321955
- The Four Seasons Tapestries at Hatfield House (London: Archetype, 2013).
- "Rare shewes and singular inventions: The Stirling Baptism of Prince Henry", Journal of the Northern Renaissance, Issue 4, 2012
- Emblems for a Queen: the Needlework of Mary Queen of Scots (London: Archetype, 2008).
- "Embroidered emblems: Mary Stuart's Bed of State", Emblematica, 15 (2007), pp. 5–32.
- "Alciato and the Earl of Arran", Emblematica: An Interdisciplinary Journal for Emblem Studies, 13 (2003), pp. 39–52.
- Renaissance Decorative Painting in Scotland (Edinburgh: NMS, 2003).
- "The sources of John Abbott's pattern book", Architectural History, 4 (1998), pp. 49–66.
- Speaking Pictures, English Emblem Books & Renaissance Culture (London: Longman, 1994).
- "Tennis in Emblems", in The Royal Game (Falkland Palace Tennis Club, 1989), pp. 44–67.
- "Weeping Stags and Melancholy Lovers: The Iconography of As You Like It", Emblematica 1 (1986), pp. 13–52.
