= Walter Binning =

Scottish painter in 16th-century Edinburgh

Walter Binning, or Bynning was a painter in 16th-century Edinburgh.

There were several painters and glaziers called "Binning" working in Edinburgh and for the royal court in 16th-century Scotland. It has been speculatively suggested that there was some family connection with the Flemish miniature painter Simon Bening.

== Career ==
In January 1540 with two colleagues Walter Binning painted 49 guns at Edinburgh Castle with red lead, including their breech loading chambers, slots and bands, and painted the ropes binding the guns on their stocks with tar, and 50 bass guns.

He was paid by the guild of the Hammermen of Edinburgh for painting cloths and a religious image.

He worked for Regent Arran in Edinburgh, Hamilton, and Linlithgow. In February 1549 he painted the roof or ceiling of the governor's lodging in Edinburgh, which was then located in Chambers Street. This was for the wedding of Barbara Hamilton and Lord Gordon. In October 1551 he was working at Hamilton and was provided with gold and silver leaf, a pound of azurite, a pound of vermilion, a pound of red lead, glue (probably for distemper paints) and sheets of Lombard paper. In October 1552 he painted the Regent's lodging in Linlithgow.

In 1554, Edinburgh painters led by Walter Binning assaulted an outsider, David Workman, who had been painting a ceiling in Edinburgh belonging to James Watson. Most of the painters were away, working for Regent Arran.

=== Shows and scenery on the Royal Mile ===
In October 1554, Edinburgh's burgh council commissioned Walter Binning to paint and refurbish their play equipment, the "play graith". This included 8 play hats, a king's crown, a mitre, a fool's hood, a sceptre, a pair of angel's wings, angel's hair or headresses, and a "chaplet of triumph". He painted banners or ensigns, and also actors' faces. The payments may have been for a performance of David Lyndsay's A Satire of the Three Estates.

Walter Binning painted scenery and costume for a triumph or show at the Tron on Edinburgh's Royal Mile to celebrate the marriage of Mary, Queen of Scots and Francis II of France, on 3 July April 1558. The wedding itself took place in Paris on 24 April 1558. The Edinburgh entertainment was written and produced by William Lauder and William Adamson. Binning painted the "play cart" for actors portraying the signs of the seven planets and cupid. There were artificial "summer trees" with fruit made from tennis balls covered with gold foil or leaf. The seven planets had been portrayed in the shows in Paris after the wedding.

In February 1562 the royal treasurer paid him £20 Scots, possibly for painting work in connection with the masques and mummery at the wedding of Lord James Stewart and Agnes Keith. In February 1566, Darnley was presented by with the Order of Saint Michael by a French ambassador, Nicolas d'Angennes, sieur de Rambouillet. Binning painted the French royal arms as a backdrop to the ceremony at Holyrood Palace. The events included a costumed masque and subsequently there were allegations that the French visit had occasioned immorality in the Canongate.

=== Reign of James VI ===
Binning made copies of the coat of arms of John Hepburn of Bowtoun, John Hay younger of Tallo, James Ormiston, and the Earl of Bothwell, to be ceremonially torn in half at Parliament in December 1567. These men were thought to be guilty of the murder of Lord Darnley.

In January 1572, Walter Binning and the glaziers David Binning and Steven Loch were listed among supporters of Mary, Queen of Scots, in Edinburgh who were summoned to appear at Leith for their disloyalty to the Regent.

In May 1577 Walter Binning painted the new north gallery of Holyrood Palace, constructed by William MacDowall.

=== Walter Binning's house ===
Binning had a property near the High School and the old Black Friars. He paid five shillings annually for the "land" belonging to Blackfriars where he lived. In October 1567 he was asked to return building materials salvaged from the Friary to the site for the construction of a new hospital at Trinity College Kirk. Binning had made a yard or garden on part of the churchyard and the town council ordered this to be removed.

After Binning's death his house came to be the property of a stonemason, Walter Biccarton.

== Glaziers and painters ==
In Edinburgh the craft and trade of a decorative painter overlapped with the profession of a glazier. This seems to have been usual, and in medieval Antwerp both painters and glass workers joined the Guild of St Luke.

Robert Binning glazed David's Tower and the chapel in Edinburgh castle in January 1540, and also painted and gilded carved heraldry at Holyrood Palace. In 1547, Robert Binning painted spears or staves used by the Edinburgh fraternity of Hammermen in their processions. Walter Binning painted an "almonry" (a sort of cupboard) for the Hammermen and two banners jointly commissioned by the Hammermen and the Mason and Wrights in 1549.

In August 1555 and 1559 Walter Binning was listed with the glaziers in the minutes of the Edinburgh incorporation of Masons and Wrights. The other were; John Sampson, Thomas Watson, Adam Symmer (or Somer), Thomas Bynning, James Hunter and John Yairds. A foreign painter, French Guillaume, was also mentioned in the minutes. James Hunter eventually became the king's glazier in October 1584, though Mary, Queen of Scots appointed Steven Loch first, in May 1562.

In August 1550 lead and glass was sent to Hamilton Palace, and Walter Binning supplied glass with the arms of Regent Arran. In January 1552 Walter Binning supplied glass for the windows of Regent Arran's chamber in Edinburgh, and in 1553 a horse was hired to take glass he had supplied to Hamilton.

Thomas Binning worked as a glazier providing glass to the Tolbooth and council house in 1563. His brother David Binning (d. 1576) was made as a burgess a glazier or glasswright in April 1569. David Binning was paid 5 shillings to paint on the pillar of repentance in St Giles' Kirk, "This is the place appoyntit for publick repentence".
