= John Workman (painter) =

John Workman or Warkman (died 1604) was a Scottish decorative painter working in Edinburgh. His brother James Workman was also a painter.

== A family of painters ==
He was a son of David Workman, who was himself an Edinburgh painter and burgess of the town, and Margaret Schortess. There were several painters of the Workman family in Edinburgh, including Charles, James, and John. John Workman provided decorative painting, gilding, and heraldic work. There is no record of him making portraits.

John and other members of his family probably painted some of the Scottish Renaissance painted ceilings but documentary evidence for such work is sparse. David Workman painted the "roof of the inner tolbuith of the lordis and above the chymnay thairof" in November 1581 for the town council for 24 merks.

== Royal entry in 1590 ==
Workman's brother James painted a ship, the Angel of Kirkcaldy, which was hired from David Huchesoun to join the convoy bringing Anne of Denmark and James VI back from Denmark in May 1590. He was paid £8 Scots. Painting and decorating the James Royall of Ayr for the king's outward voyage in 1589 had cost more, and an anonymous painter had received £20. Red and yellow, the Stewart colours, seem to have predominated.

Workman and his brother James painted and gilded several items for the Entry and coronation of Anne of Denmark in 1590, including; heraldry for the gates of Edinburgh, imitation stone work in the pends of the gates, decorating the mercat cross, the globe, tabards for actors in the drama, some of them pupils of Edinburgh high school, a bed at the Salt Tron, and a baton and rod for Hercules. The accounts mention "painting the young men". These men escorted the queen on the royal mile in a pageant known as the "convoy of the moors". They wore masks and the skin of their arms and legs was painted to dress them as imagined African people.

James Workman's paintwork within the arches or pends of the city gates in 1590 was called "drawing of alschellar draughtis", the imitation of ashlar stonework. William Fairlie paid James Workman to paint the six staffs used to carry the canopy above Anne of Denmark used during the Entry and Coronation.

James Workman drew out the royal arms for embroiderers for "cloths" or wall hangings made in 1601.

== Royal Game of the Goose ==
In 1602, James Workman painted a board for James VI used for playing a game called "guse" or goose. Known as Giuoca dell Oca in Italy, the Game of the Goose was popular in royal courts in the late 16th century. Players progress by the thow of dice along a course of around 63 squares painted in a spiral.

== Painters and glaziers ==
Painters were closely associated with glaziers in the Edinburgh craft fraternity. In December 1598, James Workman was a witness at the baptism of a son of the glazier John Owen. The bookbinder James Broun was the second witness. John Owen had been a witness at the baptism of a daughter of the painter Thomas Binning in April 1595. After 1606, James Workman resided at Burntisland in Fife. In June 1611, he painted a press cupboard and shelves green at Holyrood Palace.

== Herald painter ==
In 1592 John Workman was made a herald painter by privy seal letter.

He painted items for the funeral of the Bonnie Earl of Moray, but not the famous portrait of the dead earl at Darnaway. In March 1595 he painted a new loft for scholars in Trinity College Kirk with sundry colours of oil paints.

He decorated a coach used by Anne of Denmark when she left for England in 1603 at the Union of the Crowns.

John Workman died of plague on 31 October 1604. His will includes a stock of colours for painting, with orpiment and azure.
