= Duncan Thomson =

Scottish exhibition curator (born 1934)

- Born: October 1934 (age 91)
- Occupation: Art historian

Duncan Thomson (born October 1934) is a former director of the Scottish National Portrait Gallery and an authority on the art of Allan Ramsay.

== Publications ==
- Painting in Scotland, 1570–1560 (Edinburgh: HMSO, SNPG, 1975)
- Benjamin West & The Death of a Stag: The Story Behind the Painting and its Conservation, (National Galleries of Scotland, Edinburgh, 2009), ISBN 9781906270124 (editor)
