= Jean Sinclair =

Scottish nurse of Mary, Queen of Scots

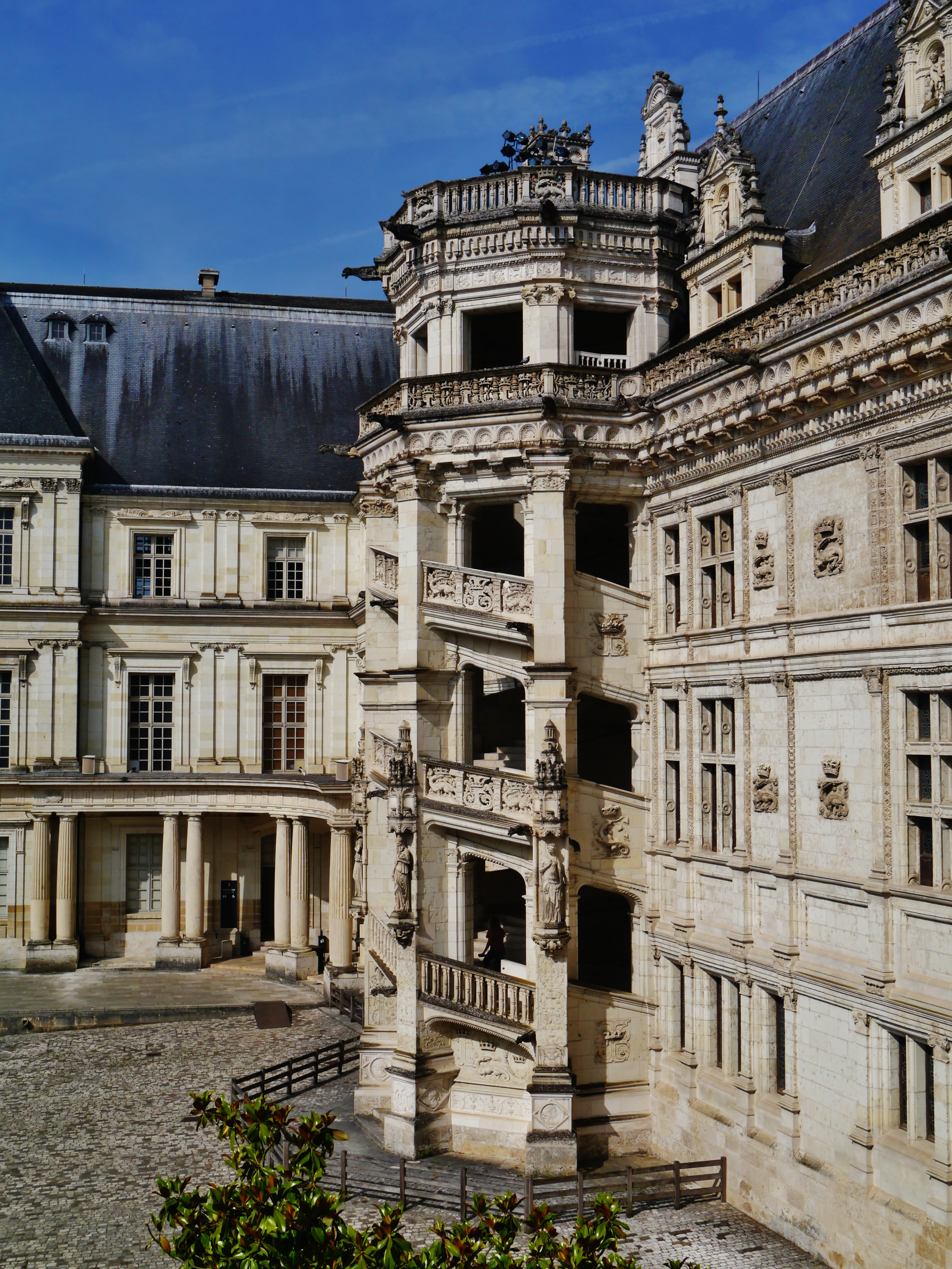
Jean Sinclair found herself at the Château de Blois with no income

Jean or Janet Sinclair (died before 1557), was the Scottish nurse of Mary, Queen of Scots.

== Career ==
In a letter to Mary of Guise written in 1553, Sinclair mentions her long service starting as nurse to her short-lived son Prince James, born in 1540.

Mary, Queen of Scots was born at Linlithgow Palace in December 1542. At Linlithgow on 22 March 1543, Mary of Guise asked Jean Sinclair to unwrap the queen from her swaddling clothes to show the English ambassador Ralph Sadler that she was a healthy infant. The scene was depicted by a 19th-century artist Benjamin Haydon. Cardinal David Beaton gave the nurse at Linlithgow £11 on 29 December 1542.

In July 1543, the infant queen was moved to Stirling Castle. As the war with England now known as Rough Wooing continued, Mary and her household including her governess Janet Stewart, Lady Fleming went to Dumbarton Castle on the Clyde and sailed to France.

In 1552 or 1553, Mary of Guise paid her 2,633 livre tournois. When Jean Sinclair wrote to Mary of Guise from the Château de Blois in 1553 she signed her letter "Jaine Syncler, nureis to our soveraine lady". In French records, her name was recorded as "Jehanne de St Clere".

She was anxious that she had been omitted from the household allowances and hoped that Mary of Guise would be able to help. Sinclair wrote that she was "come of honest folks" and would not be persuaded to abandon the service of Queen Mary. Sinclair complained that formerly she had her meals with the "lord's daughters", meaning the four Maries, Mary Beaton, Mary Fleming, Mary Livingston and Mary Seton, who had been sent away to Poissy for a time. The change was made by Henri II who thought Mary would do better with fewer Scottish companions.

Around this time, Françoise de Paroy, d'Estainville, Mary's governess, wrote to Mary of Guise that more attendants, beside the nurse or nourrice were required. The young queen's household in France was re-organised again in 1554 by Comptroller Astier, who subsequently came to Scotland as director of military finance during the refortification of Eyemouth and Inchkeith. Among the new appointments in the French household, Claude de Pons, demoiselle du Mesnil, was made governess of the young women. In 1555, Mary's grandmother, Antoinette of Bourbon, complained that only Agathe Burgensis, the chamber woman, slept in Mary's bedchamber.

Jean Sinclair was granted lands at Cornton and at Newtonlees near Dunbar in March 1543. Her husband was John Kemp, probably a brother of Henry Kemp of Thomastoun, pursemaster to James V and keeper of his jewels.

Jean (or Janet) Sinclair died sometime before 1557. John Kemp outlived her and continued to receive her pension from the lands of Cornton. Queen Mary mentioned them as "Jehanne Saint-Clere" and "Jhan Camp" in a letter to her mother about a property transaction in May 1557.
