= Robert Mangot =

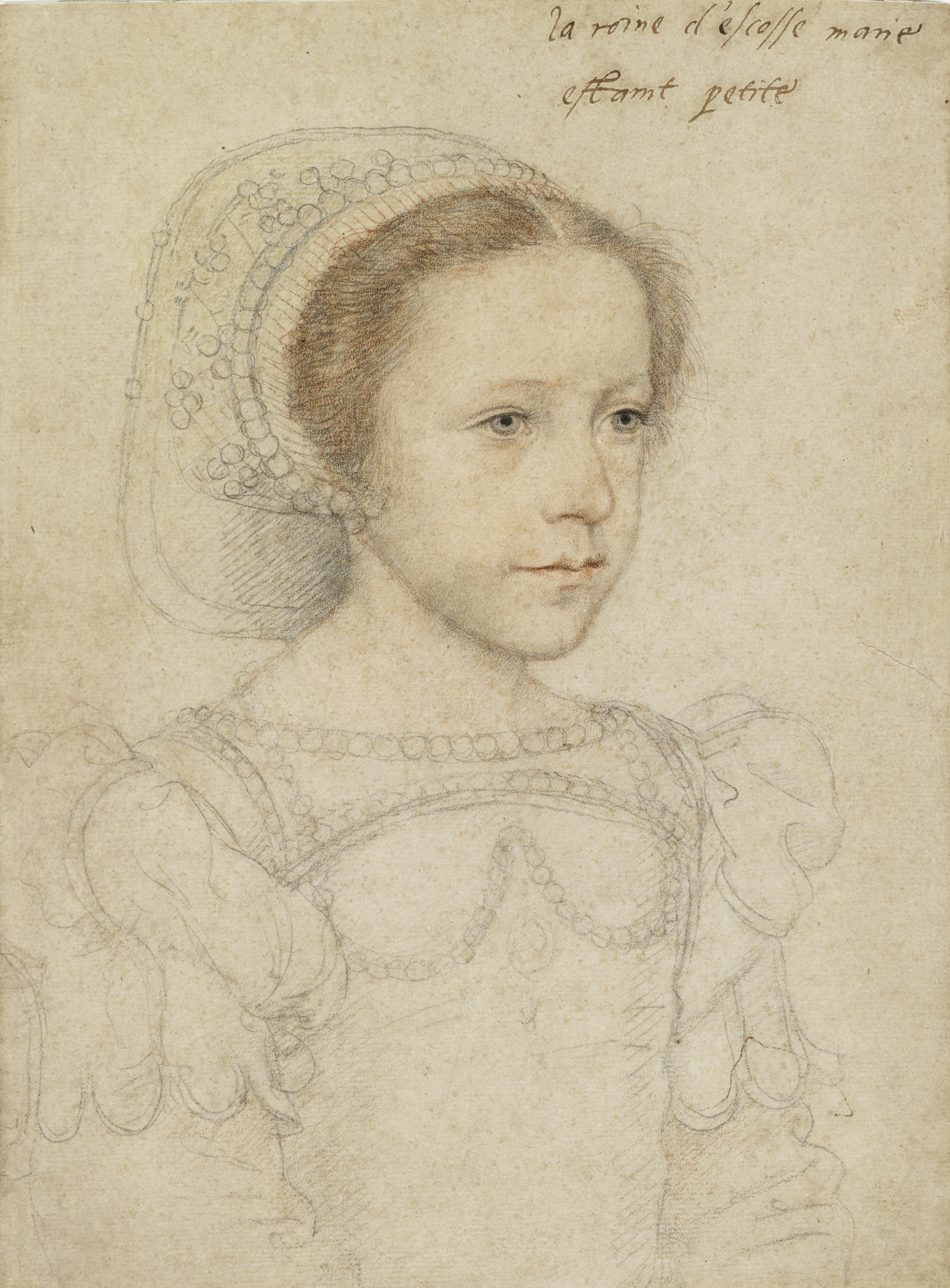
Robert Mangot made gold rosary beads for Mary, Queen of Scots, in 1551.

Robert Mangot (died 1566) was a French goldsmith who supplied the royal court and Mary, Queen of Scots. He was a son of the goldsmith Pierre Mangot who worked for Francis I of France.

== Pierre Mangot ==
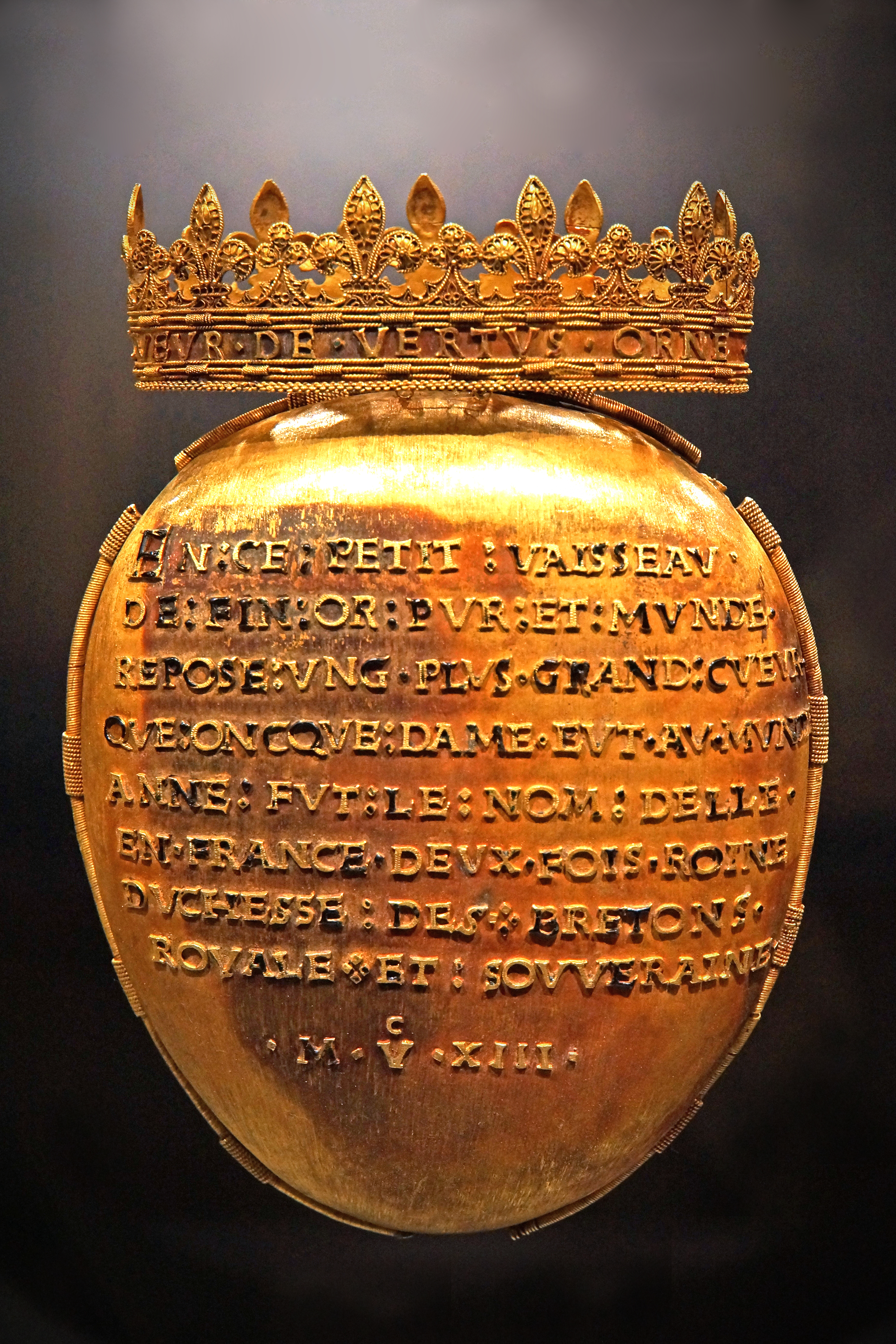
The heart reliquary of Anne of Brittany, made in 1514, has been attributed to Pierre Mangot and his colleagues.

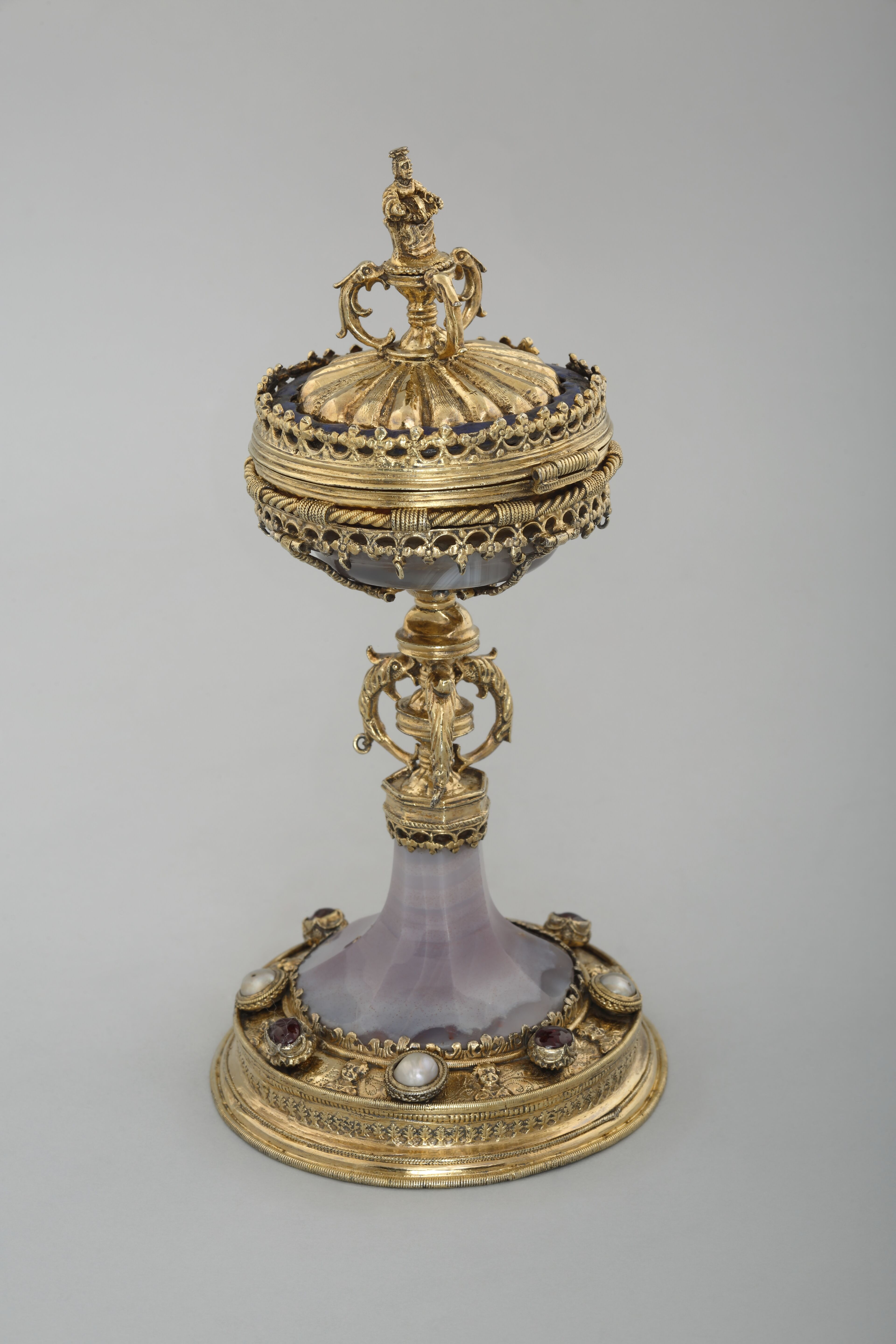
Le baguier de Pierre Mangot.

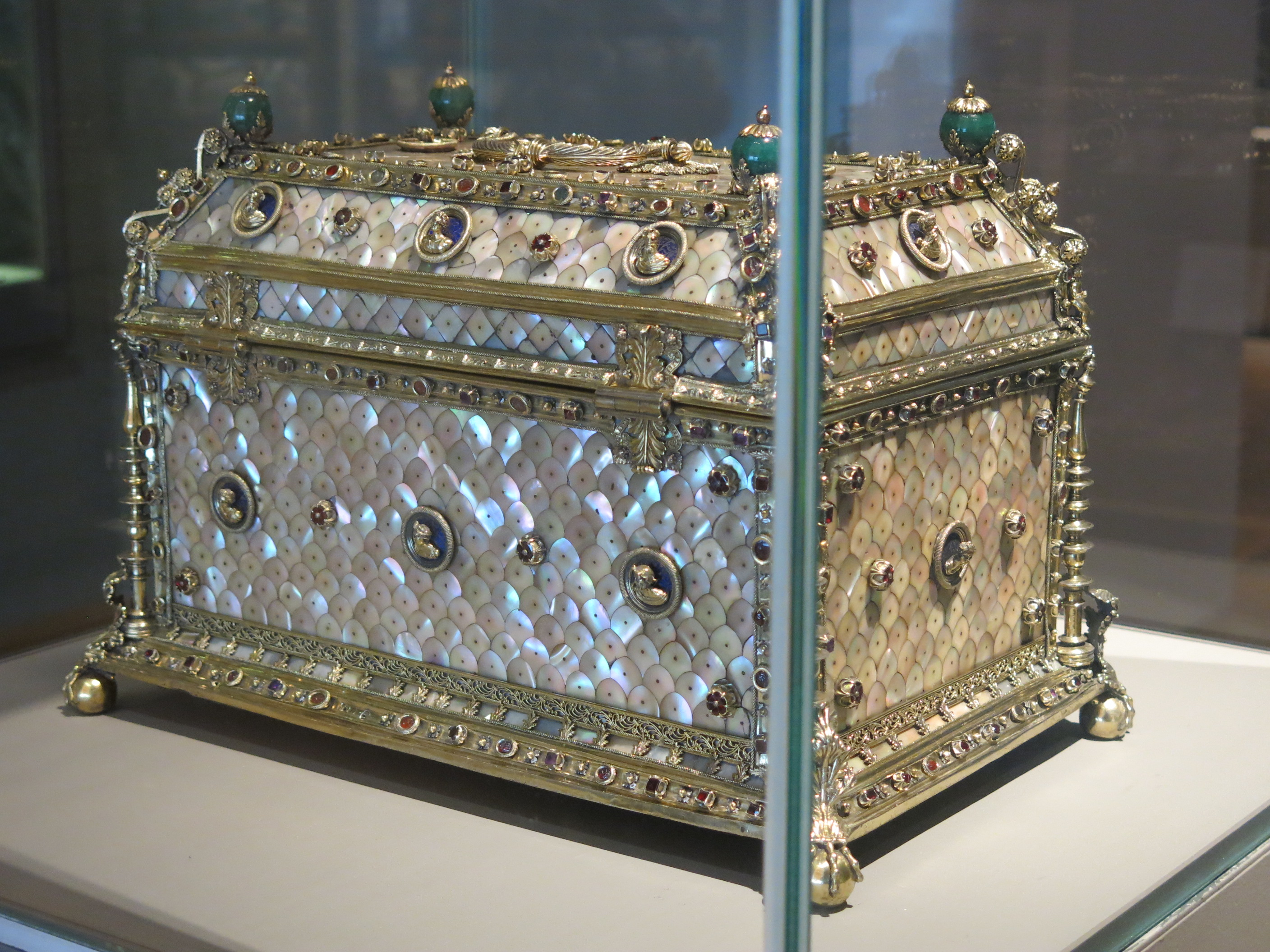
Casket or coffret made by Pierre Mangot for Francis I, incorporating a mother of pearl box made in Gujarat, possibly as a gift for Anne Boleyn. Louvre, OA 11936. Formerly owned by William Randolph Hearst.

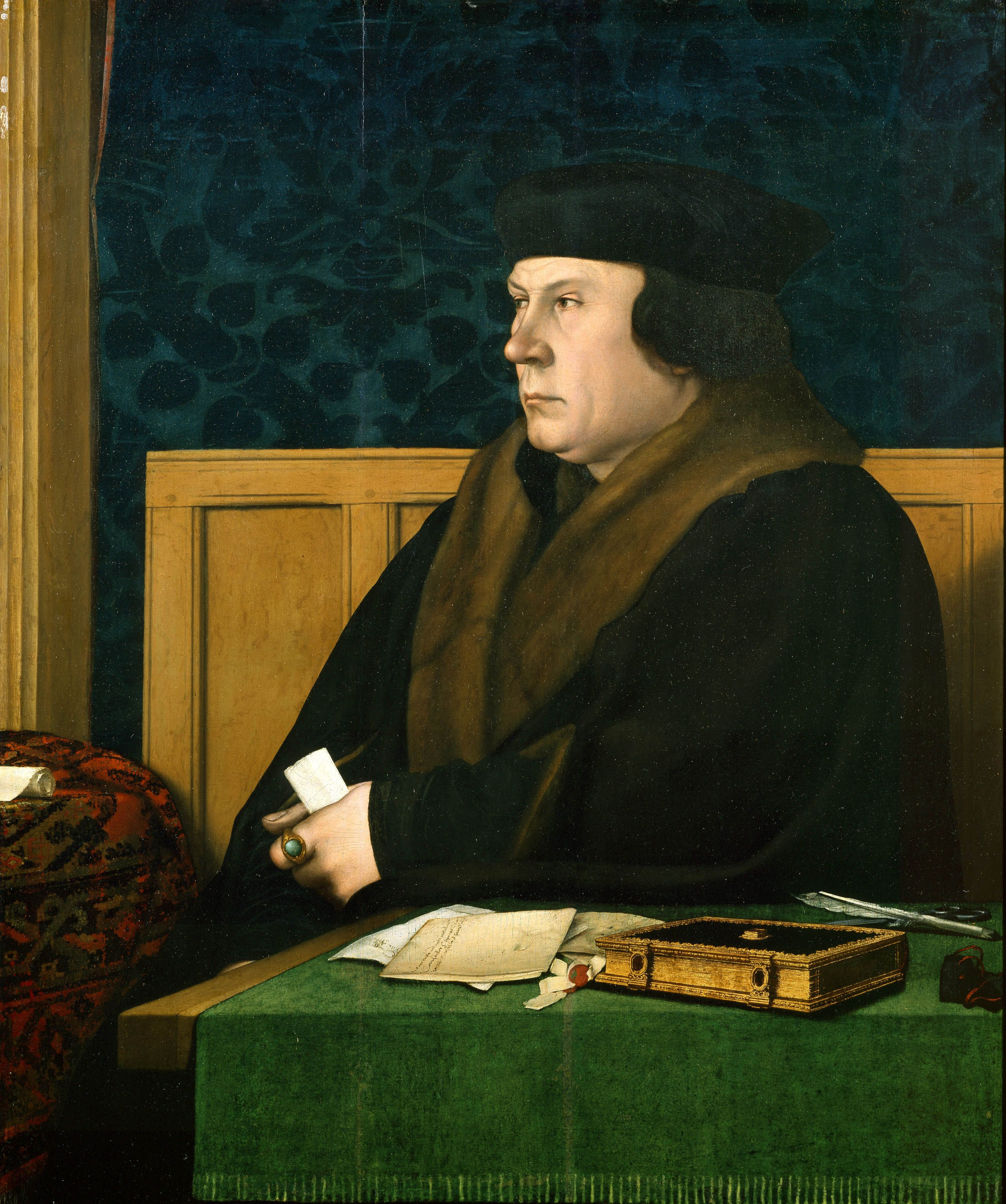
Pierre Mangot made silver mounts for bookcovers, as depicted in the portrait of Thomas Cromwell by Hans Holbein, Frick Collection

Pierre Mangot was a goldsmith who worked for Francis I of France. Works attributed to Pierre Mangot include the "Royal Clock Salt" now owned by the London Goldsmith's Company which once belonged to Henry VIII of England, and may have been a gift from Francis II when Henry married Anne Boleyn, and a gold casket decorated with Limoges enamel plaques held by the British Museum known as the "Sibyls Casket".

Mangot's hallmark appears on the silver-gilt mount of a book belonging to Trinity College, Cambridge, which seems to be depicted in the portrait of Thomas Cromwell by Hans Holbein the Younger, and on a jewelled cup known as "Le baguier de Pierre Mangot". Mangot's use of a hallmark depicting a crowned "M" was identified by a Louvre curator, Michèle Bimbenet-Privat.

Pierre Mangot and Louis Deuzan or Denzen mounted jewels and made an imperial-style arched crown for the funeral regalia of Louis XII, in 1515. Mangot made a crown for the effigy of Anne of Brittany at her funeral, and was possibly, with Geoffroy Jacquet and the artist Jean Perréal, the maker of her crowned heart reliquary (which survives at the Musée Dobrée).

Pierre Mangot and Jean Hotman probably supplied the many gifts made by Francis I to Henry VIII and his courtiers at the Field of the Cloth of Gold in 1520. Pierre Mangot supplied Francis I with some items before the King went to Italy, and was paid for these pieces and a covered cup and a covered jug in January 1527. In 1526, Mangot provided a gold collar of the Order of Saint Michael given to John Stewart, Duke of Albany, in compensation for his losses in the Italian campaign. Mangot replaced two collars of the Order that the King had lost at Pavia. Mangot made more collars of the Order in 1527, one intended to compensate Francis de Bourbon, Count of St. Pol for his service in Italy.

In January 1529/30, Pierre Mangot's servant or assistant, Pierre Le Mussier, received payment for a chain made as a diplomatic gift for the English ambassador, George Boleyn, Viscount Rochford. Mangot made a coronet for the wedding of Catherine de' Medici and the Duke of Orleans in 1533.

As well as the chains of the Order of Saint Michael, Pierre Mangot was paid for dress accessories by Francis I, including "bordeures" (worn on a French hood), ornaments for sleeves, and paternosters. He made a gold crown for Catherine de' Medici to wear as Duchess of Orléans at her wedding. His assistant Pierre le Messier (or "le Mercier") sometimes received the payments.

Some older sources include another goldsmith called Pierre Mangot, or perhaps the same man. He married the widow of Louis Deuzan or Denzan, Jehanne Boulyer, who owned property in Blois. He died around 1563, and is known as Pierre Mangot II. Their daughter, Magdalene Mangot married another goldsmith, Gilles de Suramond or Suraulmone, who worked for Henry II of France. Pierre Mangot II made gold chains for diplomatic gifts to ambassadors, and Gilles de Suramond worked in enamels and made collars of the Order of Saint Michael.

== Robert Mangot ==
Robert Mangot, Pierre's son and successor, was based in Paris. One of Pierre Mangot's apprentices, a compagnon or facteur, François Dujardin, is also regarded as a successor to Pierre as a goldsmith to the French court and served Charles IX of France. Dujardin was Pierre Mangot's facteur in October 1538, and received payment for another collar of the Order given to Francis de Bourbon, Count of St. Pol, by now the Duke of Estouteville.

In 1551 Robert Mangot supplied a gem of green jasper spotted with red, known as a heliotrope, engraved with the figure of an Indian. He attended the funeral of Henry II of France as a royal goldsmith, as did his kinsman Gilles de Suramond and Jean II Cousin (died 1568), a goldsmith and medal engraver.

The young Mary, Queen of Scots, had jewels repaired and refashioned by Parisian goldsmiths including Robert Mangot, Jean Doublet and Mathurin Lussault. An account for the household of the royal children in 1551 held by the Bibliothèque nationale de France includes some of Mangot's bills, and is digitized and available online. Mangot made gold paternoster beads and "gerbes" for her rosaries. An entry for these reads:

Pour xlviii grosses gerbes d'or poisant ensemble onc quatre gros pour garnir paternostres ... Pour facon desdict gerbes

For 48 large "gerbes" of gold weighing one and a quarter ounces to garnish paternosters ...For the fashion (making) of the said "gerbes"

The "gerbes" in this account seem to be small entredeux spacing beads. Larger beads used in rosaries to separate decades were known as "gauds" in Scottish and English inventories. The wife of John Port, a servant of Henry VIII, owned a rosary described as a "pair of coral beads gawdyd with gawdys of silver". A belt or girdle, refashioned in 1566, with knots of pearl and coral with gold "jarbis" or "gerbes" appears in the 1579 inventory of jewels that Mary left behind in Edinburgh. The goldsmith George Heriot held a necklace with 80 gold "jerbs" belonging to Margaret Douglas, Countess of Bothwell the wife of Francis Stewart, 5th Earl of Bothwell.

Mangot provided Mary with a girdle or belt and a descending chain, made in Spanish fashion, and supplied 1,500 gold buttons to decorate bands of silver embroidery that edged a black velvet gown, with several other items and pieces for the other royal children. At the same time, Jean Doublet made several accessories for Mary, and silver mounts for a coffer or coffret for Elisabeth of Valois. Jean Doublet became the goldsmith to Francis II of France as Dauphin.
