= Hotman (disambiguation) =

- Hotman, Japanese television program

Hotman may also refer to:

- François Hotman (1524–1590), French Protestant lawyer and writer
- Jean Hotman, Marquis de Villers-St-Paul (1552–1636), French diplomat, son of François
- Jean Hotman (goldsmith) (died 1555), Parisian goldsmith
- Nicolas Hotman (c. 1610–1663), composer and musician
- Hotman Paris Hutapea (born 1959), Indonesian lawyer
