= Wedding of Mary, Queen of Scots, and Francis, Dauphin of France =

Wedding of Mary I of Scotland and the future Francis II of France

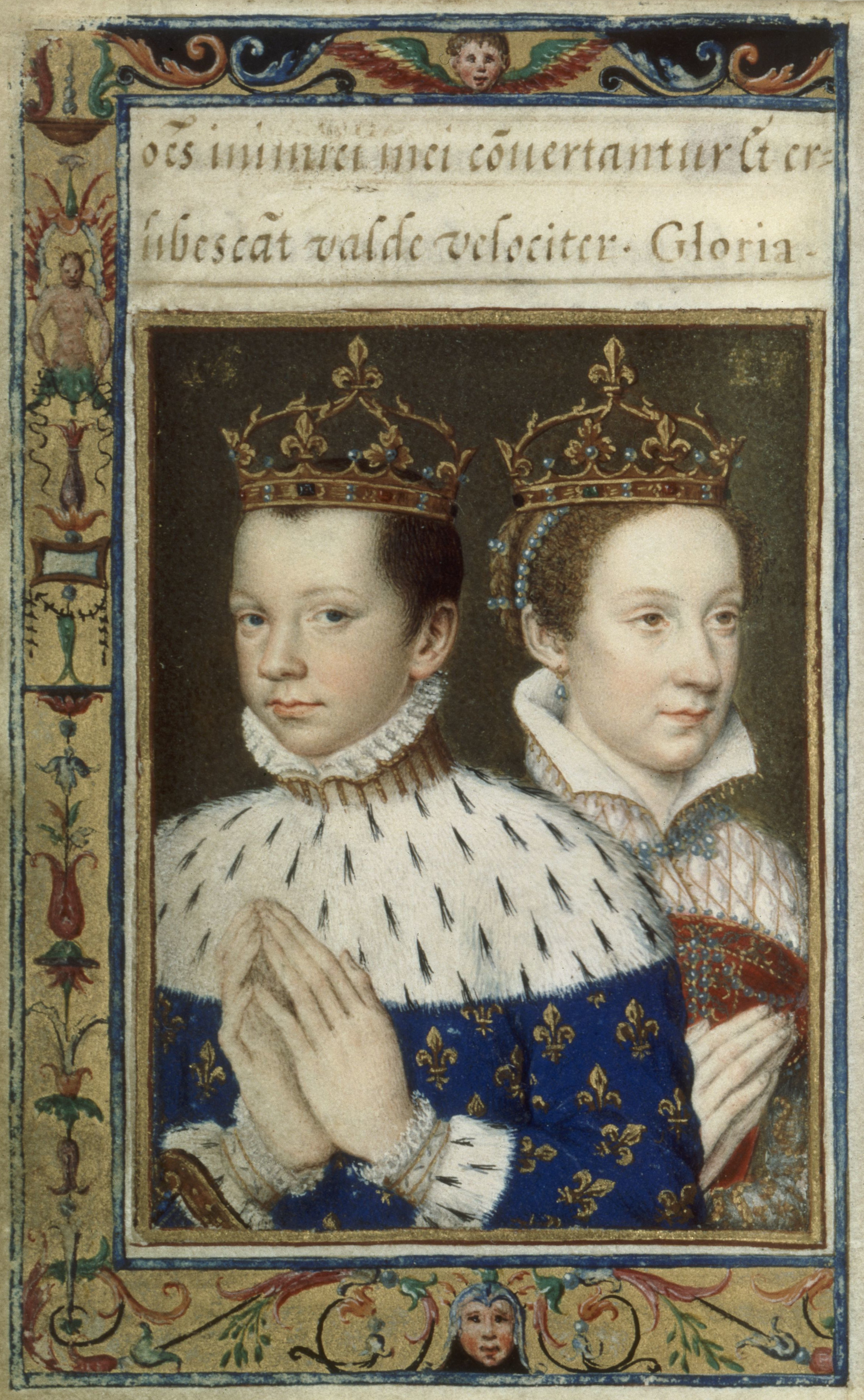
Francis II of France and Mary, Queen of Scots

Mary, Queen of Scots (1542–1587) married Francis, Dauphin of France (1544–1560), at Notre-Dame de Paris on 24 April 1558.

== Background ==
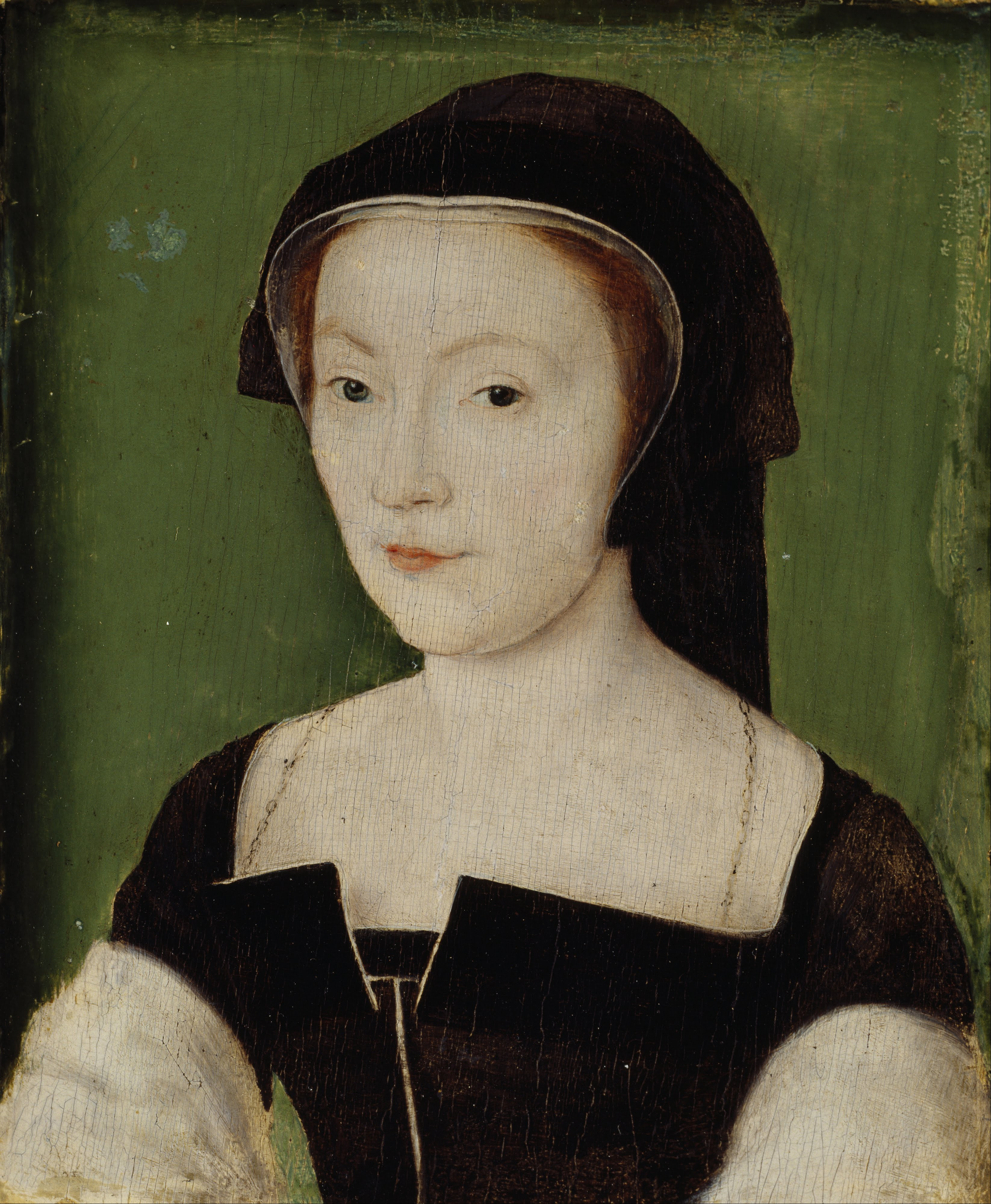
The marriage was a triumph for Mary's mother, Mary of Guise, who ordered celebratory bonfires to be lit in Scotland, Scottish National Portrait Gallery

Mary became the Scottish monarch soon after her birth when her father, James V, died in December 1542. A plan for her to marry the English Prince Edward was controversial in Scotland, and resulted in a war between England and Scotland, now known as the Rough Wooing. After Scottish forces were defeated on at the battle of Pinkie, a Convention of Scottish nobles at Edinburgh on 16 October 1547 agreed to pursue an alliance with France. They hoped Henry II of France would give them financial aid and military support. They were prepared to give Henry II strongholds in Scotland including Dunbar Castle. Mary would be sent to France and married to the Dauphin. A French diplomat Henri Cleutin promoted these arrangements and gained the consent of James Hamilton, 3rd Earl of Arran, who ruled Scotland as Regent and Governor.

Mary was sent to France, taking ship at Dumbarton, following an agreement contracted at Haddington on 7 July 1548 by Henri Cleutin and André de Montalembert with the Regent Arran.

Mary was brought up at the French court with the royal children Elisabeth of Valois and Claude of Valois, and betrothed to the heir of the French crown, the Dauphin, Francis of Valois, the son of Henry II of France and Catherine de' Medici.

=== Arguments for and against the wedding ===
Mary's mother, Mary of Guise, ruled as regent from 1554. By the end of 1556, she felt that the wedding of her daughter and the dauphin ought to take place sooner rather than later. She thought the Parliament of Scotland would be more likely to accept her pro-French policies if Mary was married to the French prince. Opponents claimed she was replacing traditional Scots laws with French practice, and the Parliament had rejected her proposals for a tax. There were also troubling rumours that Mary, Queen of Scots, was unwell, and might not survive. Mary of Guise wanted the wedding to cement a dynastic union of France and Scotland.

Henry II of France had a role in the decision as protector of Scotland, and in the French court a party, including the Constable of France, Anne de Montmorency, 1st Duke of Montmorency, opposed the marriage and the power it would give to Mary's uncles François, Duke of Guise, and Charles, Cardinal of Lorraine. According to James Melville of Halhill, the brothers argued that the marriage would enable Henry II to build more fortresses and hold stronger garrisons in Scotland. After gaining the support of the Scottish Parliament, Mary of Guise was able to frame her arguments in March 1557 for the wedding as a measure in Henry's military interests.

== Betrothal ==
Henry II requested that Scottish commissioners be sent to France to finalise the marriage treaty. The commissioners for the marriage in 1558 did not agree with proposals that Francis should have a coronation in France after the wedding, with the Honours of Scotland, but he would become King of Scotland, entitled to a crown matrimonial.

Already, Mary had signed documents at the Palace of Fontainebleau on 4 April 1558 which disposed her rights to the Scottish crown in the event of her death and committed Scotland to compensate the French crown for its expenses as her ally in the Rough Wooing. These documents, which conveyed potential advantages to the French crown, are thought to have been unknown to the Scottish commissioners.

Mary and Francis were betrothed at the Louvre on 19 April 1558. They signed a contract in which Mary declared her wish and consent to marry, with the advice of the representatives of the Three Estates of Scotland and her grandmother, Antoinette of Bourbon, the Dowager Duchess of Guise. The formalities were followed by dancing. The Venetian ambassador, Giovanni Michiel, wrote that during the first dance, Antoine of Navarre whispered to him about controversy at the French court concerning the marriage plan. Anne de Montmorency, 1st Duke of Montmorency had wished the wedding deferred.

The day (19 April) is sometimes known as Mary's handfasting, a word used in an early translation of John Lesley's History of Scotland. Giovanni Michiel called the occasion, il giorno dello dar della mano.

The Scottish negotiators and commissioners for the marriage contracts included James Stewart, Commendator of St Andrews and the Earl of Cassilis, who took out personal loans with an Italian financier Timothy Cagnioli to pay their travel costs. Cassilis, Rothes, Lord Fleming, and Robert Reid, Bishop of Orkney died in Paris or in Dieppe while returning to Scotland later in the year. The diplomats may have died of plague, Mary's opponents and Scottish chronicle writers later claimed they were poisoned as victims of a plot. The surviving diplomats returned to Scotland in October in a ship commanded by Captain Delaforce, who was rewarded with a gold chain made by John Mosman.

== Wedding at Notre-Dame ==
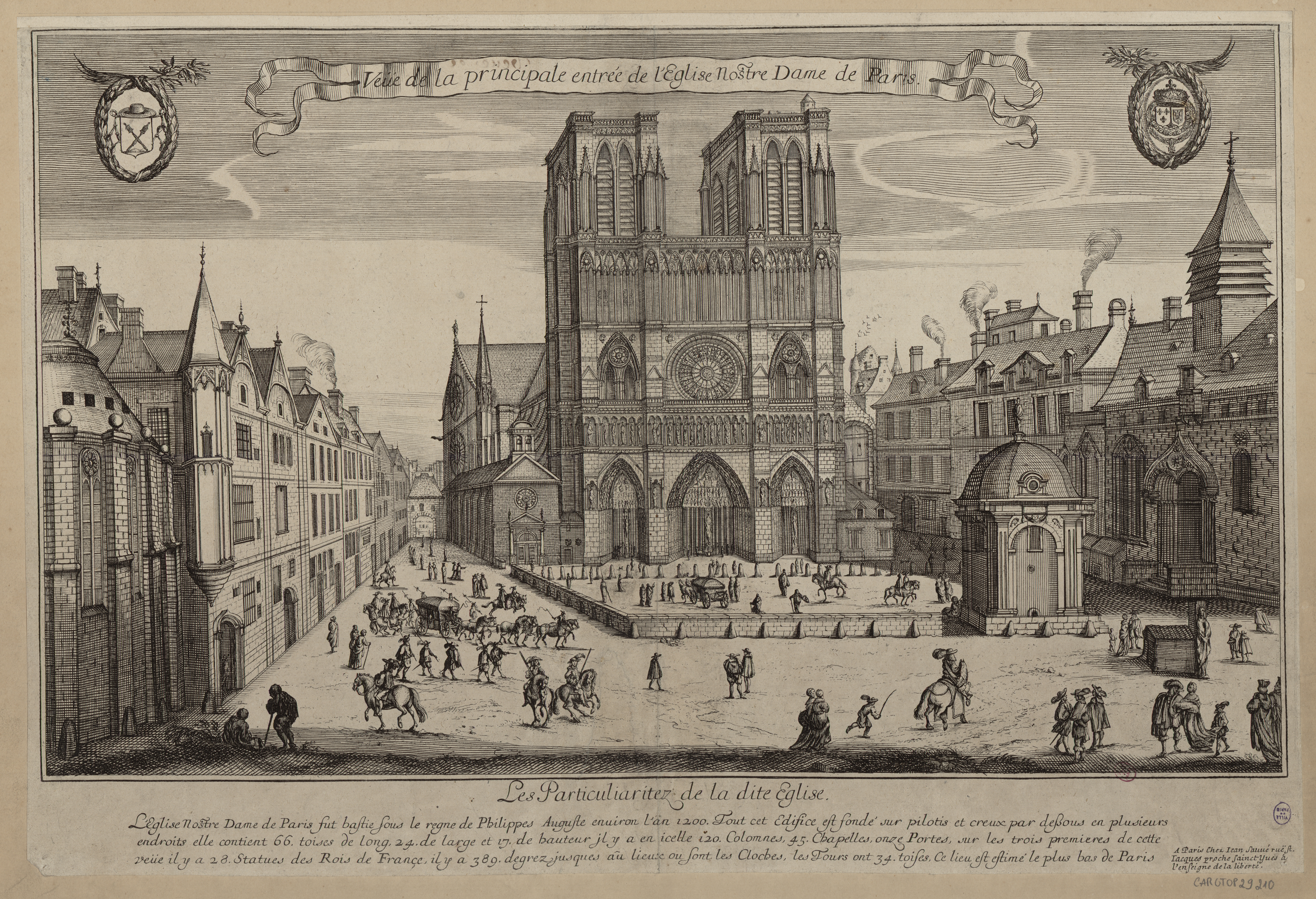
Notre-Dame de Paris and its environs, known as the parvis where a platform connecting with the Bishop's Palace was constructed for the wedding, Jean Marot, 17th century

There are several contemporary accounts of the wedding. There was a procession from the Bishop's Palace to the church on a newly built scaffold and gallery, described as a theatre ou eschaufault with a gallerie. The events of day had many similarities to the wedding of Mary's father, James V, to Francis's aunt, Madeleine of Valois, on 1 January 1537.

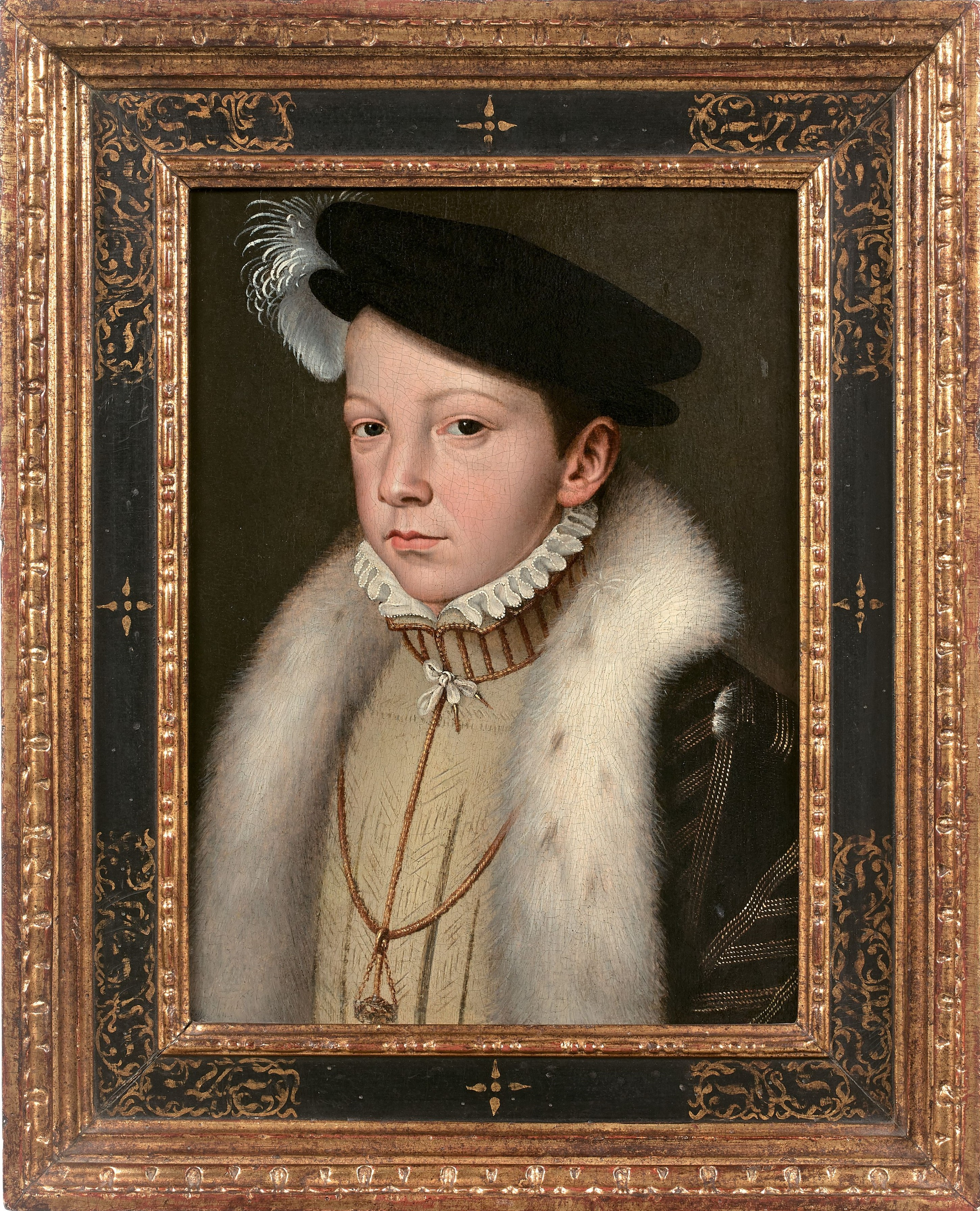
Francis II of France

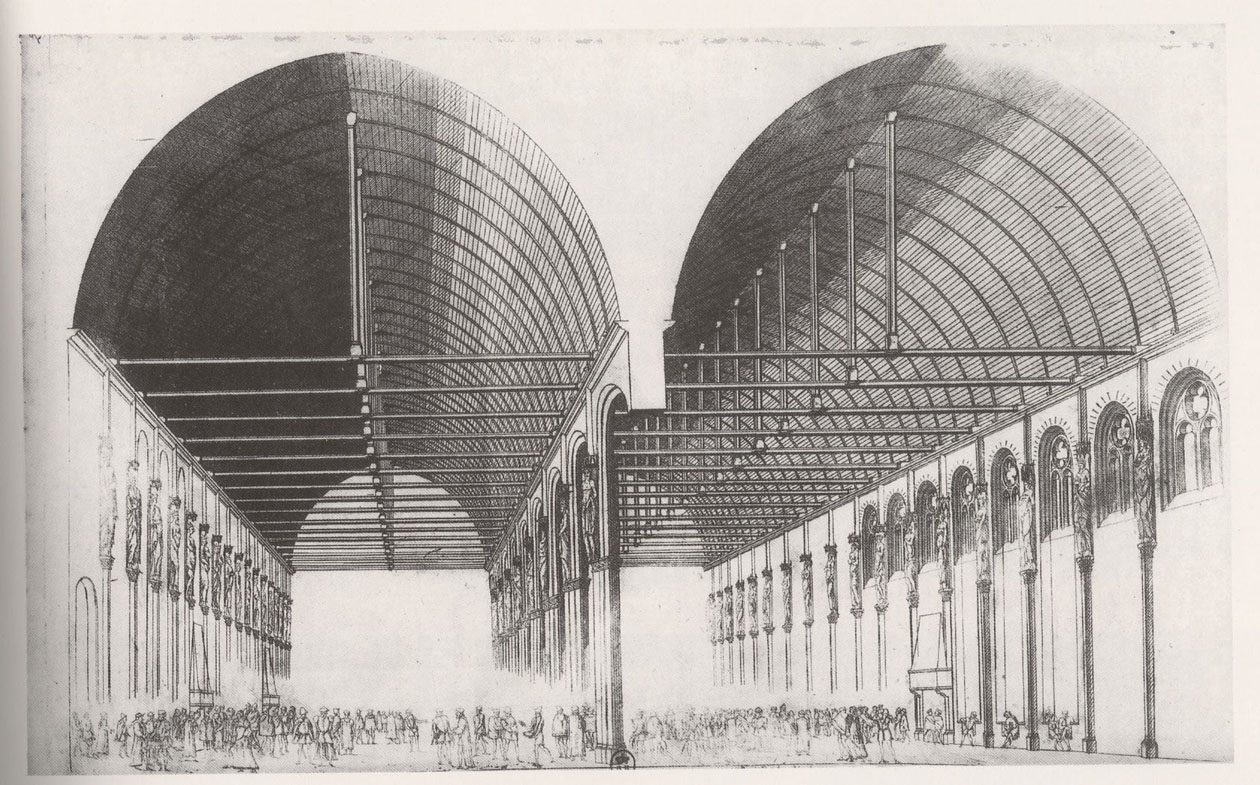
The Grand Salle of the Palais de la Cité, Jacques I Androuet du Cerceau

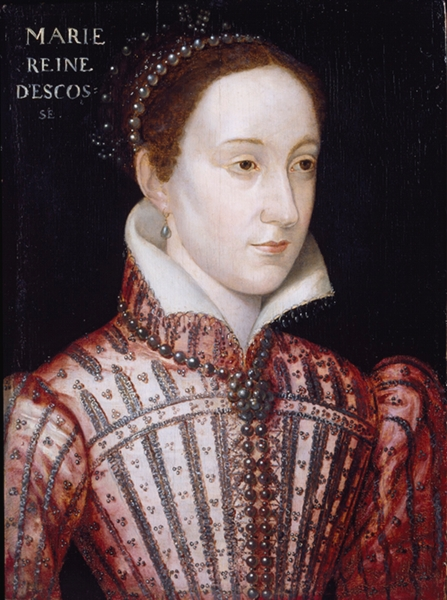
Mary, as Queen of France, after François Clouet, V&A

According to the account of the ambassador of Ferrara, Mary wore a dress of silver with a short train, covered with a purple mantle embroidered with gold with a long train. Her crown included a large ruby known as the "Egg of Naples" as a centrepiece at her forehead. The French-published Discours described the ruby as a carbuncle, an escharboncle worth 500,000 écus or more. Another account mentions her gown as une robbe de velours pers, ("pers" may mean blue or Persian), sewn with jewels and white embroidery.

Her necklace was a gift from Henry II and Catherine de' Medici, and its ruby and diamond pendant was later known as the "Great H of Scotland". The purchase of some of the components of the necklace and "Great H" can be identified in records. Catherine de' Medici bought a diamond for Mary's necklace for her espousal and wedding day from Pierre Vast and Michel Fauré, two merchants from Lyon, for 380 livres, while Jehan Joly supplied a cabochon ruby for the necklace, costing 292 livres. Claude Héry sold Catherine nine large pearls for Mary's necklace, costing 671 livres. Mary's goldsmith, Mathurin Lussault, may have assembled this jewel for the bride.

The service was conducted by Charles I, Cardinal de Bourbon. Eustache du Bellay, the Bishop of Paris, gave an address and celebrated a Mass. During the afternoon the wedding party returned to the Bishop's Palace, where they ate and danced. The Parisian dignitaries were entertained at another house at the Place du Parvis, a venue that was rather too small for the number of attenders.

== Italian style ==
There was a supper, in the great hall of the Palais de la Cité, at a marble table. The Discours mentions musical accompaniment with trumpets, clarions, haulxbois and flageolets. Afterwards, there were entertainments and masques in the same space. Mary's uncle, Charles, Cardinal of Lorraine, had a role in the refurbishment and decoration of the royal palaces, Notre-Dame, and the Grand Salle for the wedding. He discussed the design of displays of heraldry with De Pierceville, including Mary's blazons and depictions of her crown for the Louvre and other locations in March 1558.

Julio Alvarotto, a diplomat sent to the wedding by Ercole II d'Este, Duke of Ferrara, presented 200 Italian masks for the guests to wear. He also wrote a description of the events, mentioning that among the guests at the banquet, François, Duke of Guise, went unmasked better to supervise the proceedings.

As part of the entertainment, the seven planets were presented in costume and came through the hall accompanied by musicians and singers, followed by a parade of 25 princes riding wickerwork horses, a triumphal chariot, two horses trailing a banner, and a dozen mechanical unicorns caparisoned with gold and silver cloth. A second chariot presented the nine Muses, with women dressed in green, white, crimson, "pers" (like Mary's wedding gown), and cloth of silver and gold.

The last act involved six ships sailing across the hall, apparently bobbing in artificial waves with silver sails animated as if by gusts of contrary winds. The ships were draped in Stewart colours of red and yellow (or gold) and carried members of the court and royal family disguised in masks as Turkish sailors. They danced to a passo e mezzo, "taking up" partners from the audience including Mary herself. The ships sailed away with their new passengers, and so the bride and groom departed for the night.

Passamezzo dance was associated with Italian courtly intermedii and popularised in France by Catherine de' Medici. The report of Julio Alvarotto, envoy of Duke of Ferrara, mentions that the pageant ships with sails of silver tinsel cloth (tocca d'argento) had been designed by an Italian artist, "Bartho da Pesaro", (possibly Bartolomeo Campi), who had previously worked for Guidobaldo II della Rovere, Duke of Urbino. Alvarotto wrote that Charles III, Duke of Lorraine had paid six thousand ducats for the pageant of ships.

== Edinburgh ==
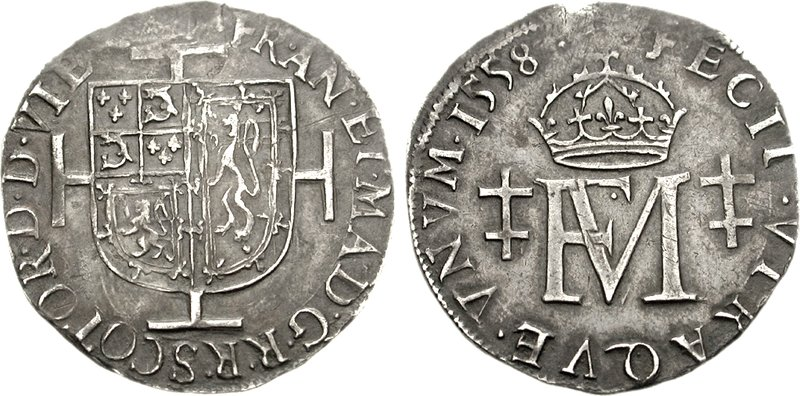
Scottish silver testoon coin with initials "F" and "M", 1558

Mary's mother, Mary of Guise, who was Regent of Scotland, ordered bonfires to be lit throughout Scotland after the Parliament received formal notification of the marriage on 26 June 1558. The burgh council and Mary of Guise organised an entertainment on Edinburgh's High Street to celebrate this renewal of the Auld Alliance on 5 July 1558. Some of the material or play text was written by William Lauder and William Adamson.

Some fabrics from the royal wardrobe were used and other materials were bought by John Balfour of the royal wardrobe, "against the solemnization of the marriage of our Sovereign Lady to be counterfeit in Edinburgh". Patrick Dorane made costumes. A decorated play cart and artificial fruit trees for a pageant of the Seven Planets and Cupid were provided by a painter Walter Binning. A similar subject had appeared in the court festivities in Paris where the Seven Planets, dressed in their emblematic colours, had sung for Mary and Francis. A gown was bought for Katherine Michelsoune, Lady Carnock, perhaps for a role in the pageant.

The old and famous cannon Mons Meg was restored to fire a salute from Edinburgh Castle on 3 July. The shot landed at Wardie. Possibly, carved and painted heraldry in the audience chamber of Holyrood Palace was a more permanent commemoration of the marriage. The lawyer and poet Richard Maitland wrote Of the Quenis Mariage to the Dolphin of France, a poem exhorting the people of Scotland to rejoice in traditional ways, "as wes the custome in our eldaris dayes".

James Mosman made a gold chain to give to the French admiral of the ships that brought the Scottish lords back from the wedding in October. The Parliament of Scotland heard the report of the marriage commissioners in November 1558 and granted the Scottish crown matrimonial to Francis II. French citizens were granted new trading privileges and rights in Scotland, reciprocating similar French acts made after the wedding.

John Knox wrote that Mary of Guise had "left no points of the compass unsailed" in her canvassing for this result. It seemed that the Scots had given control of their Queen and country to France, but opposition to pro-French and Catholic policy grew in Scotland, and the Lords of the Congregation challenged Mary of Guise's rule as Regent.

== England ==
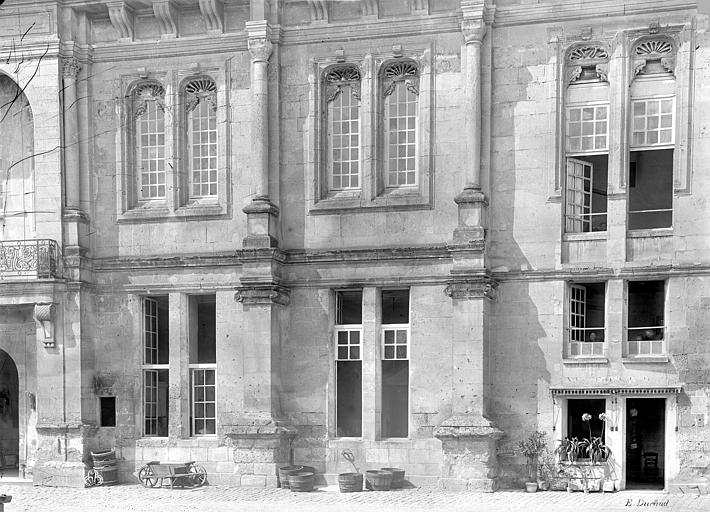
Mary and Francis went to Chateau of Villers-Cotterêts after the wedding

Mary I of England died at St James's Palace on 17 November 1558, and in France, Mary wore white mourning.

Elizabeth I was displeased to hear reports from her diplomats that new objects and buildings at the French court displayed the heraldry of Mary and Francis joined with the arms of England, asserting Mary's claim to the English throne via her grandmother Margaret Tudor. The English College of Arms declared the claim of the heraldry invalid.

She sent Peter Meutas to France with her condolences on the death of Henry II. Meutas and Nicholas Throckmorton were served dinner on silver plates engraved with the provocative heraldry. The French ambassador in England, Gilles de Noailles, discussed Scotland with Elizabeth I. In August 1559, at Horsley in Surrey, she seemed more interested in watching her courtiers "running at the ring" than hearing about French policy, an impression calculated to assert her authority. Michel de Seure, the new French ambassador in London, wrote to Mary of Guise in Scotland about the friction caused by the controversial heraldry. By the Treaty of Berwick, Elizabeth I agreed to send a military taskforce to aid the Lords of the Congregation at the Siege of Leith.

== Mary and Francis ==
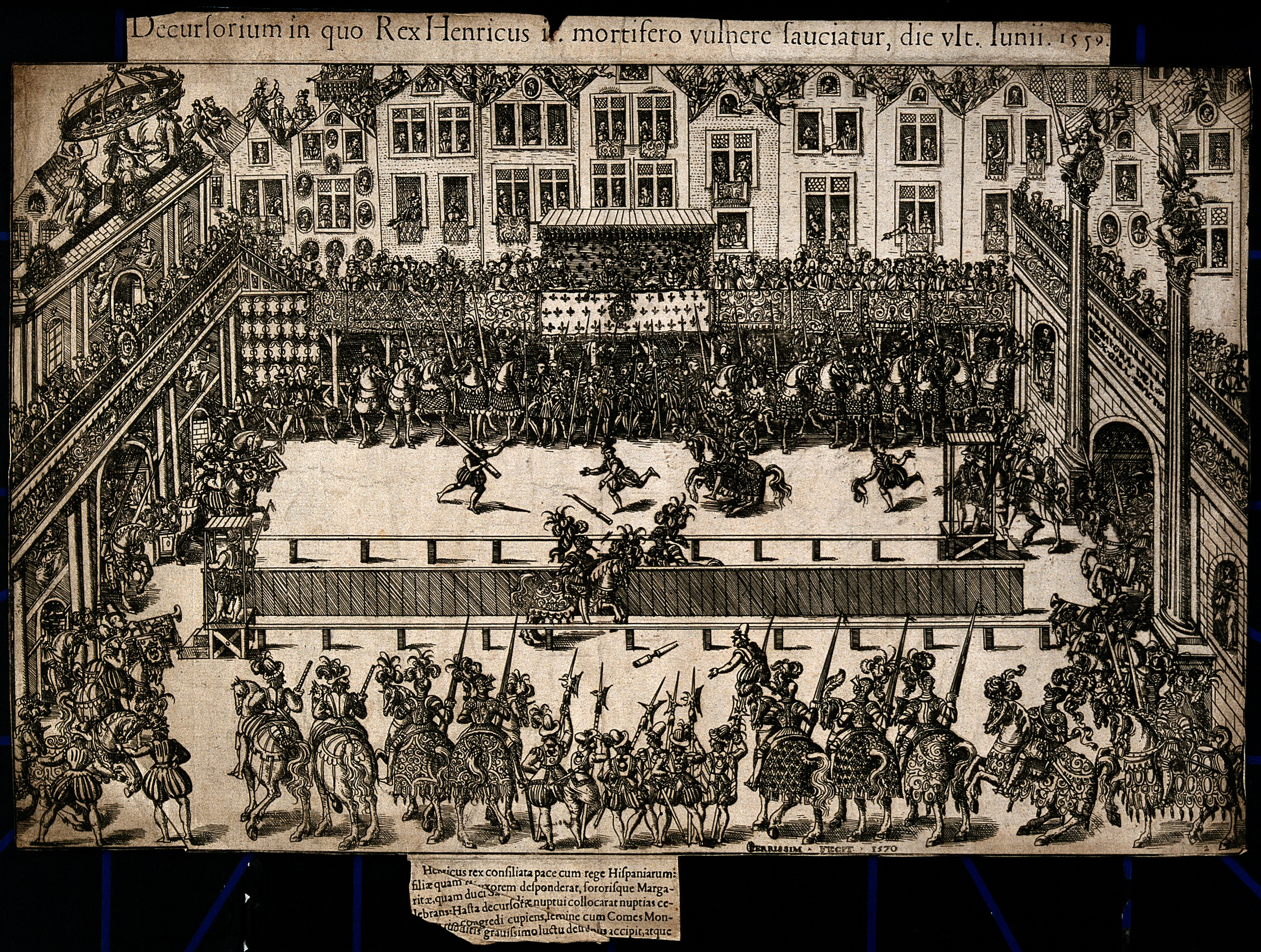
The fatal tournament at the Hôtel des Tournelles

After the wedding Mary and Francis went first to the Chateau of Villers-Cotterêts. In Paris, the Great Hall or Grand' Salon was redecorated with designs supplied by Primaticcio for the weddings of Elisabeth and Margaret of Valois in January 1559. Mary, as the Reine Dauphine, bought counterfeit precious stones for their wedding masque costumes. In the summer of 1559 there were false rumours that she was pregnant.

Henry II died on 10 July after receiving a wound at a tournament at the Château de la Tournelle, held to celebrate the marriage of his daughter Elisabeth of Valois to Philip II of Spain. Francis and Mary made ceremonial entries to Reims on 15 September 1559. Francis II was crowned at Reims; although Mary was present, she had no ceremonial role. As Queen of Scotland she took precedence over the other royal women, and wore white. Francis and Mary spent May and June hunting. They made a Royal Entry at Châtellerault in November 1559, and were threatened by the Amboise conspiracy in March 1560.

At Amboise, on 1 April 1560, Mary and Francis signed a commission for Jean de Monluc, Nicolas de Pellevé, and Jacques de la Brosse to act as diplomats in Scotland and England, and negotiate a settlement of the Reformation crisis. Mary of Guise died on 11 June 1560 at Edinburgh Castle, and the conflict in Scotland was subsequently settled by the Treaty of Edinburgh and the Reformation Parliament. Mary and Francis had little involvement in the treaty negotiations. They made a Royal Entry at Orléans in October. Francis II died on 5 December 1560.

== External links and further reading ==
- Sarah Carpenter & Graham Runnalls, 'The Marriage of Mary, Queen of Scots', Medieval English Theatre, 22 (2000), pp. 145–161
- Discours du grand et magnifique triumphe faict au mariage du tresnoble & magnifique Prince Francois de Valois Roy Dauphin, filz aisné du tres-chrestien Roy de France Henry II du nom & de treshaulte & vertueuse Princesse madame Marie d'Estreuart Roine d'Escosse (Paris, 1558), British Library Festival Books
- Discours du grand et magnifique triumphe faict au mariage de tres noble & magnifique prince François de Valois Roy Dauphin, filz ainé du très-chrestien roy de France Henry II du nom & de tres haulte & vertueuse princesse Madame Marie d'Estreuart roine d'Ecosse (Rouen, 1558). GoogleBooks
- Armour of Guiobaldo della Rovere, by Bartolomeo Campi, 1546, Real Armería, Madrid
- Biography of Bartolommeo Campi (died 1573), in Spanish, Real Academia de la Historia
- Pair of Stirrups, attribruted to Bartolomeo Campi, Victoria and Albert Museum
