= Francis Poyntz =

English diplomat and author

Francis Poyntz (died 1528) was an English diplomat and author who took part in a masque at the Field of the Cloth of Gold. He was a son of Robert Poyntz and Margaret Woodville, a daughter of Anthony Woodville, 2nd Earl Rivers. As a courtier, he was an Esquire of the Body to Henry VIII.

== Masque of the Nine Worthies ==
On 24 June 1520, Henry VIII presented a masque of the Nine Worthies at the Field of the Cloth of Gold at Ardres. An account for making costume includes hose for 10 performers, including the Earl of Devonshire, "Mr Norres, Mr Nicolas Carew, Mr Thomas Cheyne, Mr Arthur Polle, Lord Ferrers, Mr Bryan, Mr [John] Carre, Lord Leonard", and "Mr Frances Poynes". The Nine Worthies, as well-known figures of courage and generalship, were intended to celebrate the meeting's chivalric nature and honour the ancient heritage of England and France as nations led by chivalric warrior-kings.

Poyntz was involved in a tournament held at Christmas in 1525 at Greenwich Palace. The festivities involved the siege of a purpose-built castle in the palace tiltyard.

== Spain and France ==
Poyntz was trusted by Catherine of Aragon who used him as her messenger to Charles V. He was sent as a diplomat to Spain in 1527. Because of his relative inexperience as a diplomat, it was suggested he be accompanied by John Clerk, Bishop of Bath. Poyntz returned from Spain via Paris, where Francis I of France gave him a cupboard of silver gilt plate provided by his goldsmith Jean Hotman in November 1527.

== Death ==
Francis died of the sweating sickness during the king's visit to Hunsdon House on 26 June 1528. His widow Joan Poyntz, was a daughter of Matthew Browne of Betchworth. They had no children.

His work, The Table of Cebes the Philosopher, Translated out of Latine into Englishe by Sir Francis Poyngs, was published by Thomas Berthelet after his death.
