= Jewels of James V =

Jewels belonging to James V of Scotland

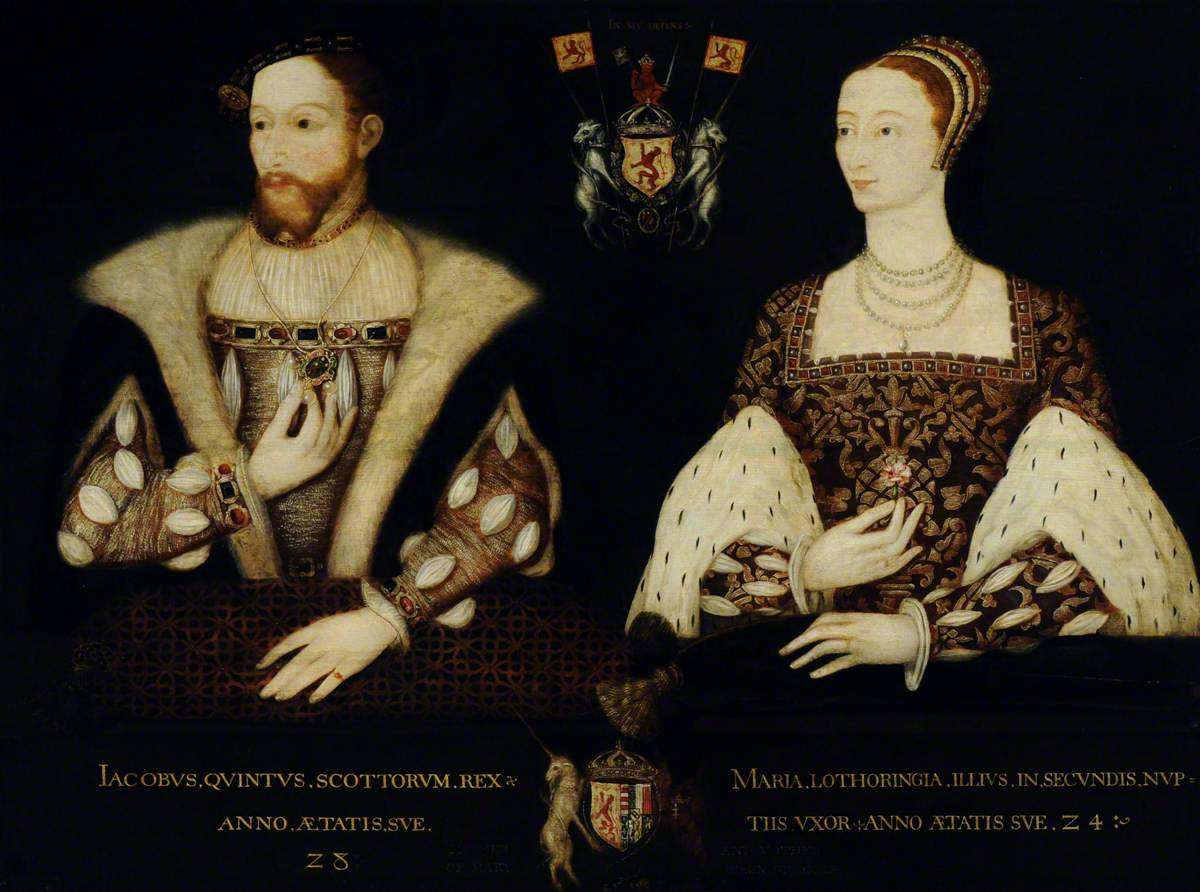
James V and Mary of Guise, Hardwick Hall

The jewellery and jewels owned by James V of Scotland are mainly known from the royal treasurer's accounts and inventories. James V reinforced his authority by lavish display.

== James IV ==
Although James V would have inherited jewels from his father James IV of Scotland, little is known of these. James IV died at the battle of Flodden in September 1513. His gold crucifix set with three balas rubies and three sapphires containing a relic of the True Cross was sent to Catherine of Aragon. It was listed in the jewel book of Henry VIII in the chapel of the Tower of London.

== Inventories and accounts ==
An inventory made in 1542 mentions a black velvet box kept in the Jewel House at Edinburgh Castle. There were several diamonds (set in rings), five emeralds, eleven rubies. three sapphires, a ring depicting a skull, and 101 loose pearls in a steel box, with two pieces of mother of pearl, around 20 small pearls, and "an ornament for a woman's breast", probably worn across the top of a gown, which featured 22 sets or knots of three pearls with friar's knots of gold between. James V had bought a large table diamond and a large ruby from a man called Howesone. A pair of bracelets set with rubies may have been coronation regalia. Strung beads were Paternosters, some were scented "must beads", others were of gold, garnet or jasper. Some other items had belonged to James's first wife Madeleine of Valois. There was a nugget of gold from the Scottish mines. Some of the pearls may have been found in Scottish rivers.

James V bought several gold chains some enamelled and set with stones. A chain set with diamonds, rubies, and pearls was bought to hang the emblem of the French Order of Saint Michael. He wore chains of gold wire with whistles, perhaps especially aboard ship. Pendants worn with chains were called "tablets", there was a diamond fleur-de-lis and a tablet with an "image of Our Lady".

James V wore bracelets, which appear in his inventories and there are also records of their repair. James had rosary beads, of agate and jasper, and of gold scented pomander beads filled with musk. The inventories list over 100 rings, Some rings were kept by the king's personal servant Harry Kemp, who kept the king's gold combs and toothpick, and a number of velvet bonnets.

Although a collar of thistles was depicted with his heraldry on the gate of Linlithgow Palace and in the king's portraits, he seems not to have instituted a knightly order, and his inventories do not include a collar of thistles.

== Rings bought in France ==
Among purchases made in France in 1537 were the diamond-set wedding ring for the King's marriage to Madeleine of Valois which cost 1,100 French crowns, and a diamond cross set with 20 diamonds costing 340 crowns. This and another similar cross were dismantled and the diamonds used to decorate the King's bonnets. James V bought another diamond ring in Compiègne costing 1,300 crowns. A diamond ring for the King's proxy marriage at the Château de Châteaudun to Mary of Guise on 9 May 1538 cost only 300 crowns.

== Jewelled hats and bonnets ==
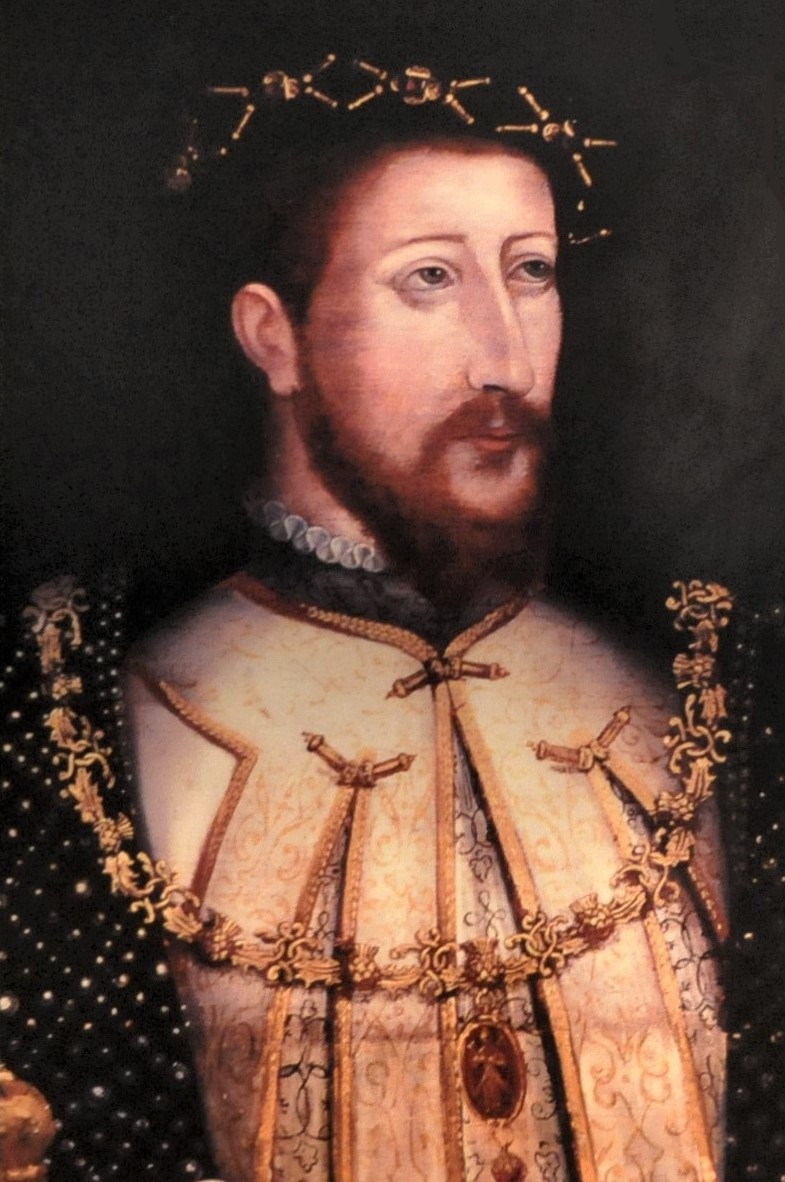
James V wore bonnets decorated with "sets" comprising aglets and precious stones

James had several hat ornaments or ensigns to be sewn on his bonnets, including two mermaid badges. One of the mermaids was made by the Edinburgh goldsmith John Mosman. The ensigns were called "targets" in the Scots language. His bonnets were also decorated with gold tags known as aglets or horns. The king's best bonnets in November 1542, kept by Harry Kemp, were described in some detail, with their ensigns, precious stones and pearls, the three examples here with modernised spelling:

Item, a bonnet of velvet with a target and an image (or figure of a woman), having a diamond in her hand with a great ruby under her feet. And upon the same bonnet ten sets, in every set four diamonds, on one side a ruby and a table diamond with 24 sets sets of pearl, in every set four pearl, with ten little thistles of gold and a little chain in every lug.
Item, a bonnet of velvet with a target set with a great table diamond, ten plain diamonds in sets of gold, 18 sets of pearl and three in every set, and nine set long, and four in every set.
Item, a bonnet of black velvet with a target of the mermaid, her tail of diamonds, with a ruby and a table diamond, 6 sets of gold, with a great ruby in every one of them, and 12 sets with two great pearls in every one of them.

The king also had bonnets of woollen cloth, which were decorated with targets and gold buttons. James had gold buttons, some set with pearls, shaped liked acorns or peas in a pod, and three had gentlewomen's faces. He bought several sets of gold buttons and "horns" or aglets in France, included 119 enamelled in azure for the riding coat he wore during his Entry to Paris. At this time he had 23 gold thistles made for his bonnet, and 20 for his gown. He bought a badge for his bonnet described as an "image with a ruby" and a gold chain and 36 buttons to dress the same bonnet.

== Pomanders and perfumed beads ==
James V owned pomanders, known as "must balls" and perfumed beads for rosaries, described as "muist" or musk beads. In 1587, his daughter Jane Stewart, Countess of Argyll, bequeathed her perfumed beads, described as "ane pair of muist beidis of gold", to Marie Stewart, Mistress of Gray. Mary, Queen of Scots owned similar beads, and the National Museum of Scotland has some of these which are reputed to have been her gift to Gillis Mowbray.

== Goldsmiths for a king ==
John Mosman made jewellery for the king, repaired items, and sometimes converted pieces, refashioning gold rosary beads into buttons and cramp rings. Mosman also travelled to France to make purchases for the king. The secretary Thomas Erskine of Halton also went to France to buy jewels. James V himself went to France and married Madeleine of France, buying gold buttons enamelled with azure and hundreds of pearls to sew on his costumes from the Hotman workshops.

Adam Leys repaired the crown of Scotland, and in 1540 Mosman refashioned and augmented it again, into the form it remains today.

The goldsmith Thomas Rynd, based in St Andrews, also worked for the king, supplying enamelled gold buttons, aglets or horns, a necklace enamelled red, and a gold belt with white letters, and three rings in May 1539. He sold a "chaffron" head dress and a chain to Mary of Guise, who was then at Pitlethy in Leuchars. James V also bought small gold chains and "tablet" pendants from him to give as gifts to the queen's gentlewomen. Later in the year, Rynd supplied a chain and a gold "target" in 1539, mending a gold cup and a set of gold buttons, and supplying two pairs of tags or horns to fasten a pair of bracelets.

== Final inventories ==
An inventory of the king's silver work and jewels was made in November 1542 before the king's death by James Kirkcaldy of Grange and John Danielstoun, Parson of Dysart, and brother of William Danielstoun, keeper of Linlithgow Palace. A clerk, Henry Wardlaw, was paid 40 shillings for writing the "inventour buke".

After the death of James V, the Earl of Arran was ruler of Scotland as regent. His representatives William Baillie of Lamington and John Kirkcaldy received the late king's wardrobe goods from John Tennent, including the crown set all over with precious stones and orient pearl together with a sceptre set with a "great beriall" (a rock crystal) in the head of it, and the sword of honour with two belts, and Mary of Guise's consort crown and sceptre. The Honours of Scotland were used at Mary's coronation in 1543.

Mary, Queen of Scots, inherited personal jewels that had belonged to her father. In 1556, after her mother Mary of Guise had become regent, Arran returned a consignment of royal jewels to the young queen in France. Among these jewels was the hat badge made in Edinburgh by John Mosman from Scottish gold, depicting a mermaid set with diamonds and holding a mirror and a ruby comb.

== See also ==
- Inventory of Elizabeth I
- Jewels of Margaret Tudor
- Jewels of Mary, Queen of Scots
- Jewels of James VI and I
- Jewels of Anne of Denmark
- Jewels of Mary I of England
