= Portrait of Thomas Cromwell =

Painting by Hans Holbein the Younger

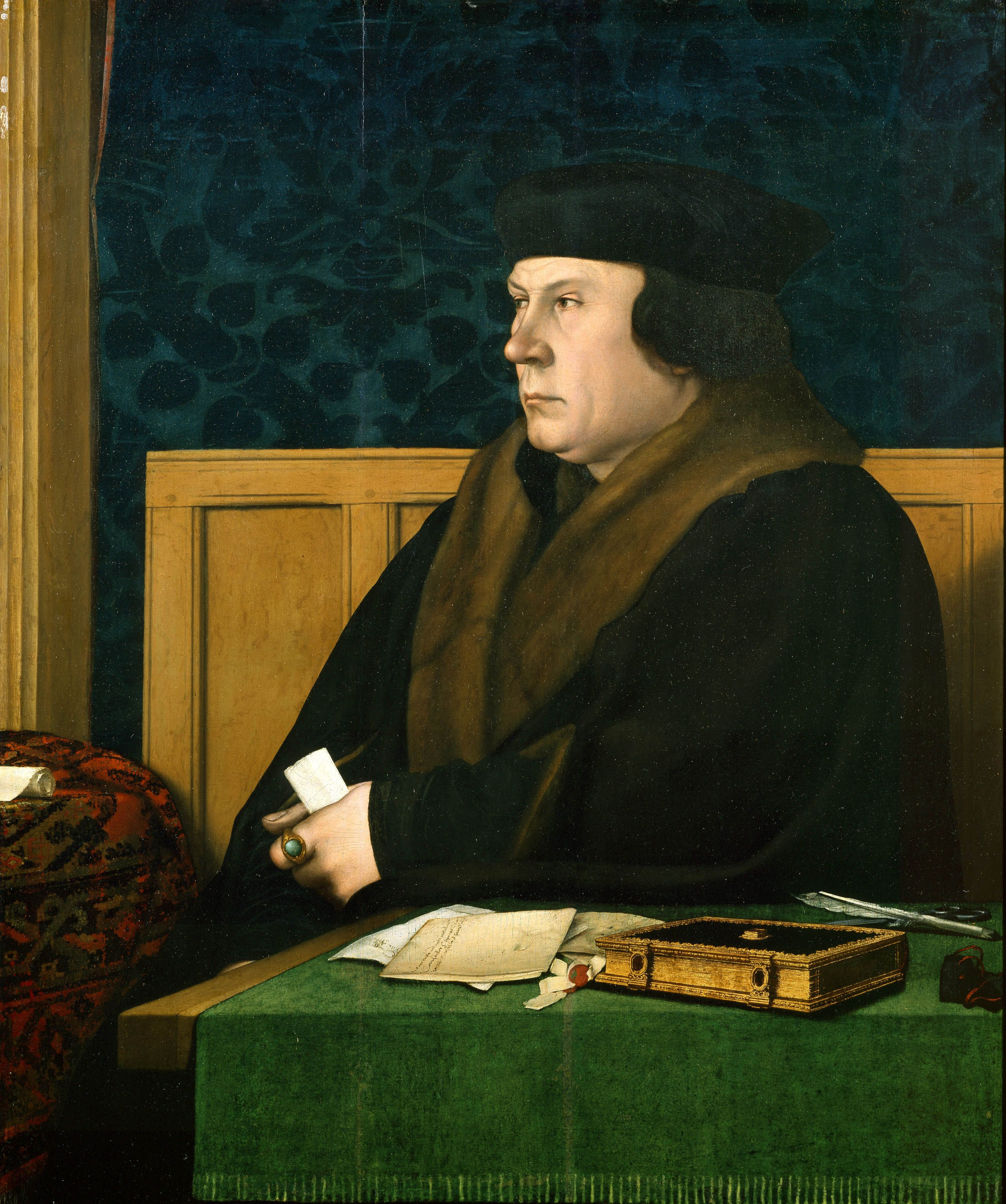
- The Frick copy of the portrait, c. 1532–33
- Artist: Hans Holbein the Younger
- Year: c. 1532–1533
- Medium: oil on oak panel
- Dimensions: 78.1 cm × 64.1 cm (30.7 in × 25.2 in)
- Location: Lost/destroyed

Portrait of Thomas Cromwell is a small oil painting by the German-Swiss artist Hans Holbein the Younger. It is usually dated to between 1532 and 1534, when Cromwell, an English lawyer and statesman who served as chief minister to King Henry VIII of England from 1532 to 1540, was around 48 years old. It is one of two portraits Holbein painted of him; the other is a tondo from a series of medallions of Tudor courtiers.

Holbein became a court painter for the English crown in 1532, under the patronage of Cromwell and Anne Boleyn and was King's Painter to Henry VIII by 1535. This portrait was commissioned by Cromwell, whom art historians assume asked that he was portrayed in a modest fashion, in contrast to the artist's other English court paintings, which tend to be lavish and flattering.

The original panel is lost, and today known from three copies: in the Frick Collection in New York, an early seventeenth-century version in the National Portrait Gallery in London, and in the Chichester Constable collection in Yorkshire.

== Holbein's relationship with Cromwell ==
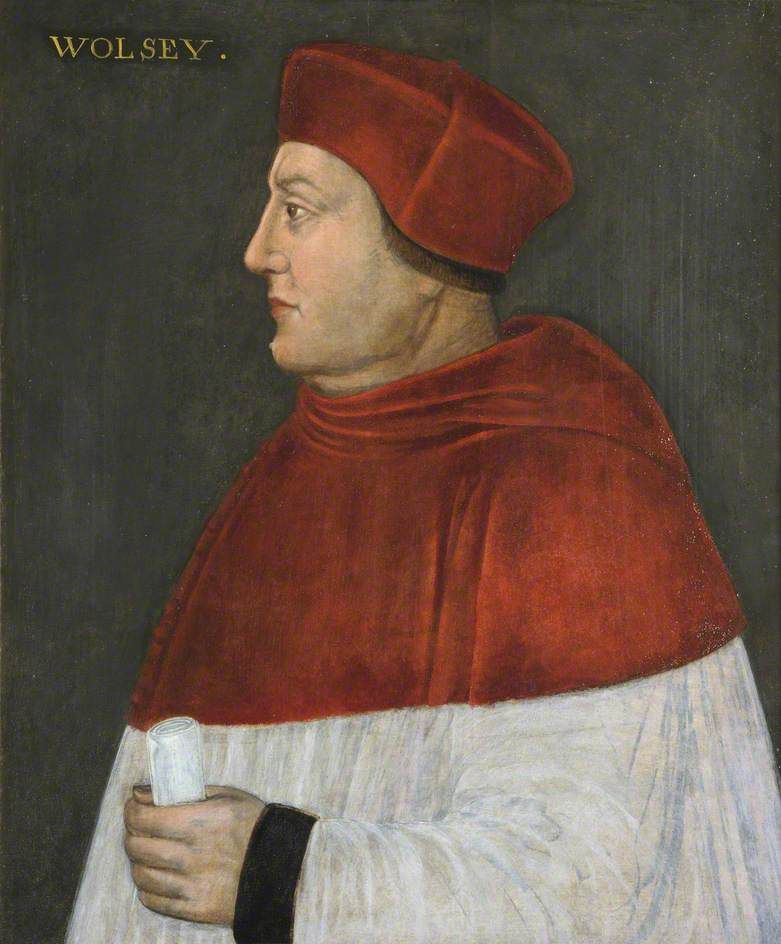
Portrait of Cardinal Thomas Wolsey, c. 1585-1596

Thomas Cromwell was a lawyer and statesman who began as a blacksmith's son in Putney, and rose to power as an associate of Cardinal Wolsey. After Wolsey's fall and a period of initial distrust, he became a confidant of Henry VIII, assuming the roles of vicegerent, Lord Chancellor, Lord Great Chamberlain, amongst others. A shrewd politician, he was aware of the effect of propaganda and commissioned Holbein to produce images positioning him as a reformist and royalist, including anti-clerical woodcuts and the title page for Myles Coverdale's English translation of the bible. In this he was both progressive and attuned to Henry VIII's grandiose programme of artistic patronage. The King's efforts to glorify his own status as Supreme Head of the Church of England culminated in the building of Nonsuch Palace, started in 1538.

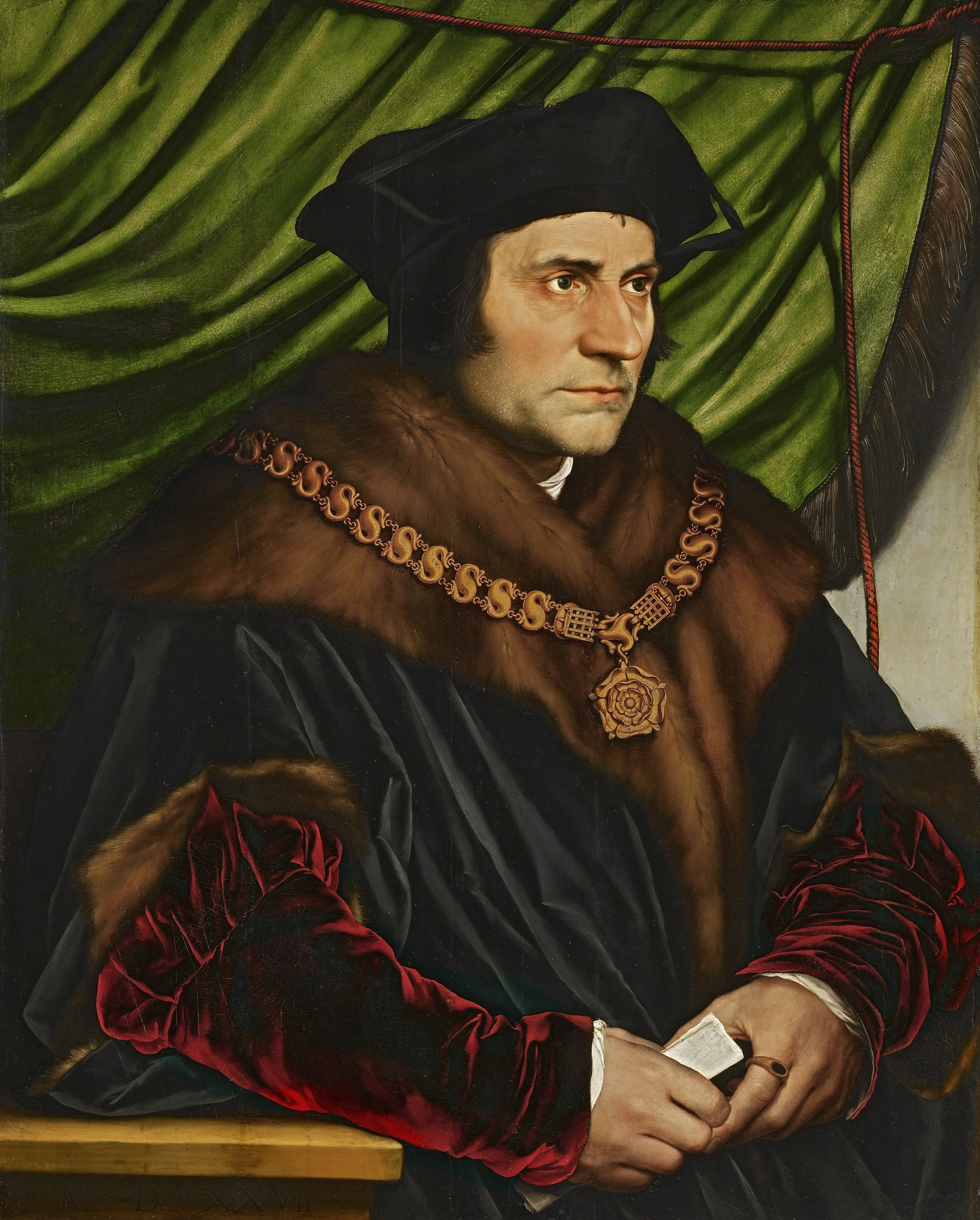
Portrait of Sir Thomas More, 1527. Cromwell was instrumental in establishing the English Reformation, and played a key role in More's downfall

Cromwell engineered the King's divorce from Catherine of Aragon. He was an early ally of Anne Boleyn but played a key role in her downfall. He was a significant force in the Tudor court until, hoping to strengthen the political alliance with the Protestant cause in Germany, he erred in advising Henry to marry Anne of Cleves. The move was unpopular and afforded his many enemies the chance to bring charges of treason, forcing his eventual arrest and beheading.

This left Holbein in an uncertain position; his guile had allowed him survive the downfalls of More and Anne, but Cromwell's sudden fall badly damaged his own reputation. Although he managed to retain his position as King's painter, his standing never recovered.

== Description ==
The portrait dates from Holbein's second visit to England, when Cromwell was acting on behalf of Henry VIII and commissioned a series of propagandistic images of favoured courtiers at a time when Cromwell's reputation was at its highest. He had emerged as the "Protestant counterweight to Thomas More in the Privy council", sealed Boleyn's position in bitter circumstance, and became one of the most influential and powerful men in England. At the same time he was cultured and instrumental in promoting Holbein's career. Perhaps because of this, and given the portrait's genesis is steeped in bloody politics of the times with an unsteady king, we know nothing of Holbein's thoughts on the depiction.

Cromwell is given due respect, but is presented as sour and somewhat stiff. The eyes are narrowly set, he tightly grips the seal. His reputation was poor until revision in the 1960s; today he is seen as a reformer and a highly capable, supreme political operator. Reflecting earlier opinion, it was noted that "of all the portraits that Holbein did at the English court, the portrait of Cromwell has always seemed the least flattering to its subject, the most viciously mocking." Mindful of the protracted, fatal relationship between Cromwell and More, and their placing at the Frick, Henry Clay Frick romantically asked that we "imagine Thomas More, the beautiful saint, and Cromwell, the monster, united in art and history, now facing each other, [through] Holbein and time and chance."

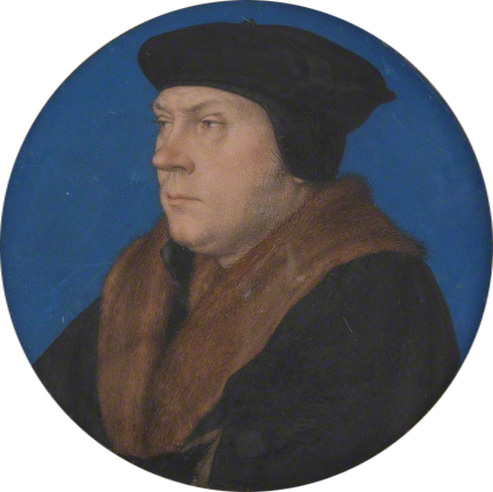
This portrait miniature of Cromwell is derived from the 1532 portrait but shows him tired and older. A similar miniature, with the Garter collar, survives and is attributed to Holbein by the National Portrait Gallery, but most scholars do not consider it an original Holbein

Compared to Holbein's other portraits of Tudor politicians, Cromwell seems reduced; he is placed low in the frame, deep in the pictorial space, placing a distance and diminishing him from the viewer. The table reaches into the immediate foreground as if reaching into the viewer's personal space. Holbein presents Cromwell as somewhat sour, cold and grim, yet the portrait has been described as "a softened version of the subject". The historian R. B. Merriman described Cromwell as "a short, stoutly built man, with a large face, smooth shaven, with close-cropped hair, and a heavy double chin, with a small and cruel mouth, an extraordinary long upper lip, and a pair of gray eyes set closely together, and moving restlessly under his light eyebrows."

The inscription on the border reads "To our trusty and right well, beloved Councillor, Thomas Cromwell, Master of our Jewel House". Cromwell sits on a bench before a table holding a legal document. His left hand has a patterned gold ring with a large green gemstone. He is dressed in sober colours, comprising a black fur lined overcoat, a black hat and a "severe expression". The table is covered with a green cloth, a symbolic reference to the Board of Green Cloth. Some of his effects are placed on the cloth, including a quill, a devotional book, scissors and a leather bag.

The devotional book was Cromwell's Book of Hours. He was a devout man and would have been keen to display it in his portrait. Cromwell's copy was discovered in the Wren Library at Trinity College, Cambridge in 2023 by researchers at Hever Castle. The book was donated to Trinity College by Anne Sadleir (1585– c.1671), the widow of Ralph Sadleir (1579–1661), a descendant of Cromwell's protégé, Sir Ralph Sadleir (1507–1587). The original silver-gilt mounts of its cover were made by Pierre Mangot. It was printed in Paris by Gilles and Germain Hardouyn in 1527, the year when Henry VIII first sought a divorce. Two other significant copies of this edition belonged to Henry VIII's first wife, Catherine of Aragon, and his second wife, Anne Boleyn. The Tudor historian Tracy Borman described it as "The most exciting Cromwell discovery in a generation – if not more."

The version in the Frick Collection is in oil on oak panel and measures 781 by 641 millimetres (30.7 in × 25.2 in).

== Attribution and copies ==
The painting is usually dated as c. 1532–4, when Cromwell was Master of the Jewel House. An undated inventory from Cromwell's London home mentions "2 tables of my master his (vis)namy painted". Little is known of the original after that. Only hours after Cromwell was taken to Traitors' Gate on 1 June 1540, soldiers arrived at his house to take his belongings to the treasury. Holbein's portrait was most likely destroyed or sold soon after Cromwell's fall; there is no record of it in any later royal inventory. Historians assume that the painting was destroyed shortly after Cromwell's execution by beheading on 28 July 1540 in the tower of London. There are three copies, in the Frick Collection, New York (where it is hung opposite Holbein's Portrait of Thomas More); an early seventeenth-century version in the National Portrait Gallery in London and in the Chichester Constable collection in Yorkshire, England. The Frick panel is considered superior in quality.

The original portrait probably showed a painted scroll on the border above his head; the text of the Frick version was removed during an early 20th restoration/improvement. The Frick wording is known from a 1915 photograph and reads: "To our trusty and right well beloved Councillor, Thomas Cromwell, Master of our Jewel House". The Frick panel underwent extensive technical analysis in 1952 and was cleaned in 1966; work that "did not substantiate an attribution to Holbein", but rather indicated the hand of a "less skilled, workshop member".

The London copy was likely commissioned by Cromwell’s descendants; according to the National Portrait Gallery it was "probably produced either when the original portrait was sold, or for display in a different family property." The Frick copy is dated to c. 1532–33.

The first mention of copies is in the records of the Countess of Caledon from 1866 when she lent it to National Portrait Exhibition. That version is now in the Frick Collection. The art historian Roy Strong believed that the three extant portraits are copies. They are all in poor condition but the Frick version is the best preserved. The historian John Rowlands deduced from the pentimenti (alteration) revealed by X-ray photographs that the Frick version shows the hand of Holbein and is the original. The art historian Stephanie Buck agrees with the attribution, although it is highly contentious. Strong counters that as a supposed traitor, Cromwell's personal effects including this portrait, were destroyed soon after his execution.

== See also ==
- List of paintings by Hans Holbein the Younger

== Sources ==
- Beckingsale, B. W. (1978). Thomas Cromwell: Tudor Minister. London: Macmillan Press. ISBN 978-0-333-14157-1.
- Buck, Stephanie (1999). Hans Holbein. Cologne: Könemann. ISBN 3-8290-2583-1.
- Cust, Lionel (October 1911). "A Newly-Discovered Miniature of Thomas Cromwell". The Burlington Magazine for Connoisseurs. 20 (103): 5–7. JSTOR 858834.
- Emmerson, Owen; McCaffrey, Kate (2023). Holbein's Hidden Gem: Rediscovering Thomas Cromwell's Lost Book. Exeter: Jigsaw Design and Publishing for Hever Castle & Gardens. OCLC 1382684836.
- Erickson, Peter; Hulse, Clark, eds. (2000). Early Modern Visual Culture: Representation, Race, and Empire in Renaissance England: Representation, Race, Empire in Renaissance England. Philadelphia: University of Pennsylvania Press. ISBN 0-8122-1734-9.
- MacCulloch, Diarmaid (2018). Thomas Cromwell: A Life. London: Allen Lane. ISBN 9780141967660.
- Nairne, Sandy; Cooper, Tarnya (eds). National Portrait Gallery: A Portrait of Britain. London: National Portrait Gallery, 2015. ISBN 978-1855144859
- Rowlands, John (1985). Holbein: The Paintings of Hans Holbein the Younger. Oxford: Phaidon. ISBN 9780714823584.
- Schofield, John (2011). The Rise and Fall of Thomas Cromwell: Henry VIII's Most Faithful Servant. The History Press. ISBN 978-0-7524-5866-3.
- Smith, Goldwin (April 1903). "A Gallery of Portraits". The North American Review. 176 (557): 530–545. JSTOR 25119386.
- Strong, Roy (May 1967). "Holbein in England – I and II". The Burlington Magazine. 109 (770): 276–281. JSTOR 875299.
- Strong, Roy (1995). The Tudor and Stuart Monarchy: Pageantry, Painting, Iconography. Vol. I: Tudor. Woodbridge, UK: The Boydell Press. pp. 73–78. ISBN 085115400X.
- Wilson, Derek (2006). Hans Holbein: Portrait of an Unknown Man (revised ed.). London: Pimlico. ISBN 0714823589.
