= Treaty of Haddington =

1548 treaty between France and Scotland

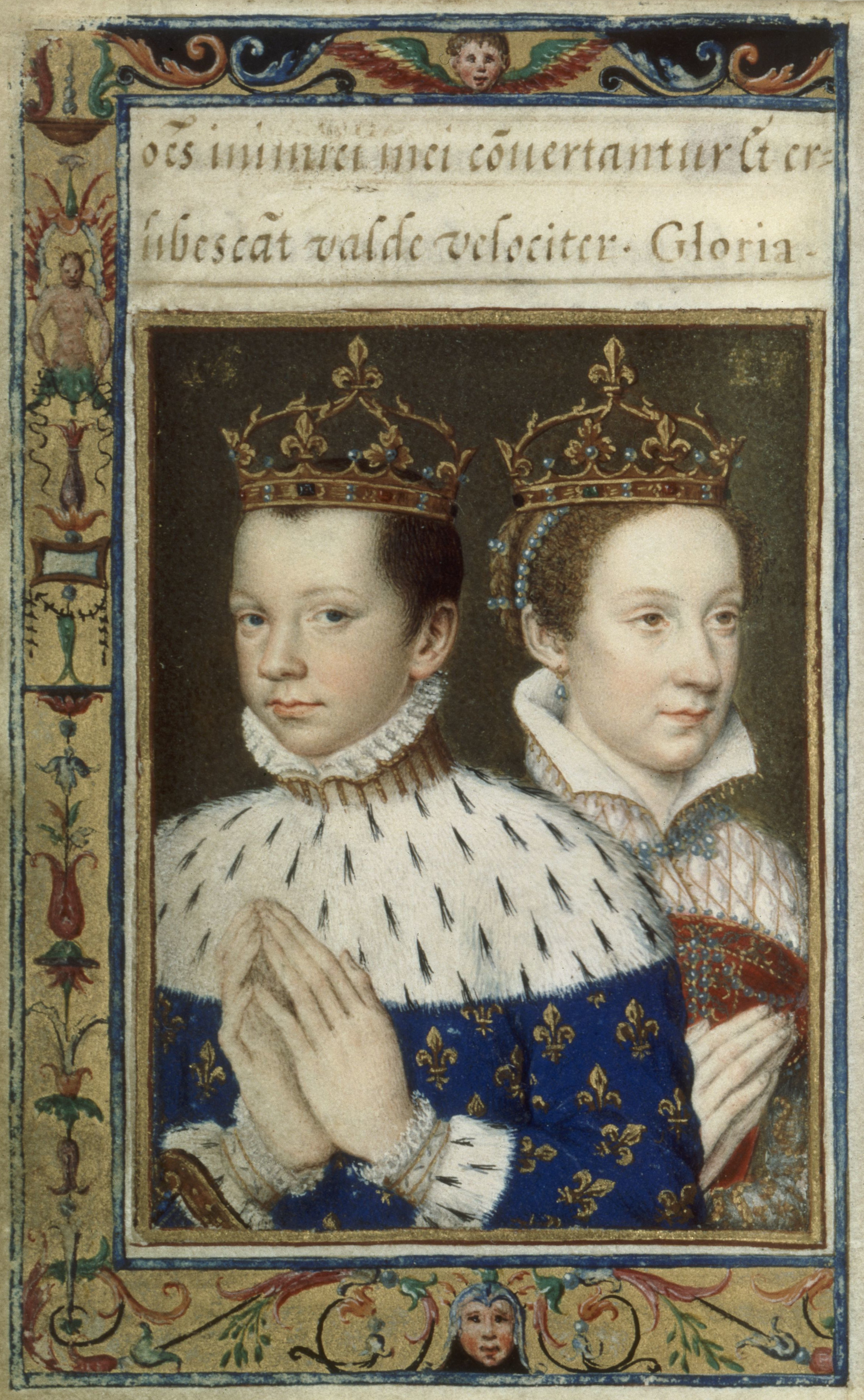
Francis II of France and Mary, Queen of Scots

The Treaty of Haddington was signed on 7 July 1548 between France and Scotland. The agreement promised Mary, Queen of Scots to Dauphin Francis in marriage in return for French assistance at the Siege of Haddington during the war now known as the "Rough Wooing" and the continuation of the "Auld Alliance". Mary, only five years old at the time, subsequently went to live in France, eventually marrying the Dauphin, while her regents ruled in her name in Scotland.

== Parliament at the Abbey of St Mary, Haddington ==
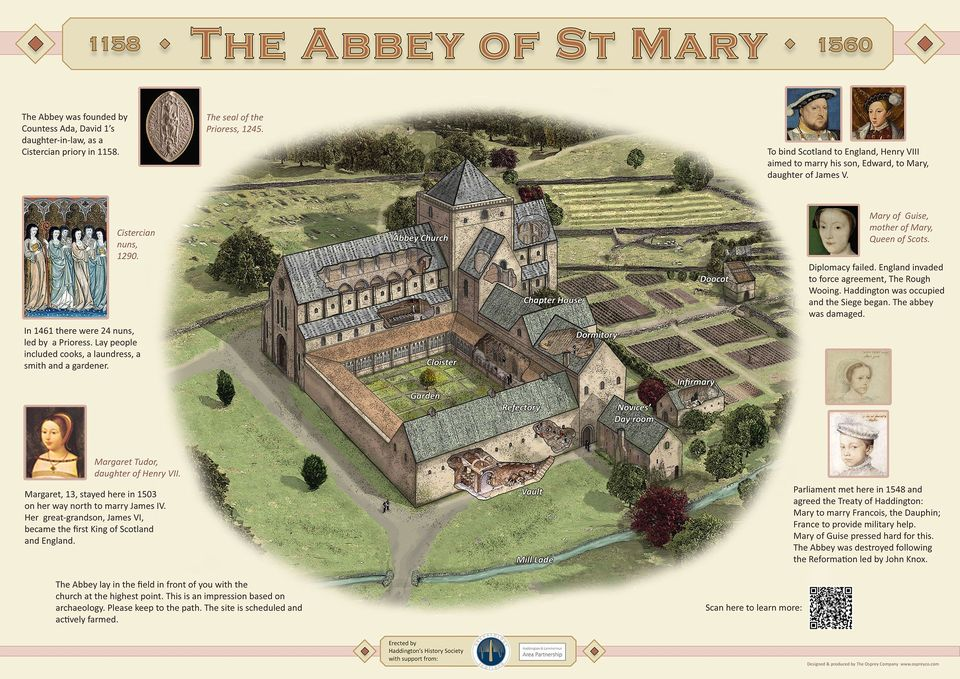
Abbey of St Mary Haddington, information panel

A French army was sent to Scotland in June 1548. Soldiers and artillery were taken to Haddington, which had been held by the English since February 1548. The meeting on 7 June was held at the Abbey of St Mary, outside the town. Tents were provided for extra accommodation. The Abbey itself was later demolished, and the site is known from the placenames "Abbey Mains" and "Abbey Mill".

The treaty was negotiated by the Earl of Arran, who earned a French duchy for himself in the process, with the French diplomats Henri Cleutin, Sieur d'Oysel and André de Montalembert, Sieur d'Essé. The agreement was made at a Convention or Parliament held at the Abbey of St Mary, Haddington. As a condition, Regent Arran had to send his son, James Hamilton, to France as security, as a "hostage".

Before Mary of Guise left the encampment at the Abbey, the English cannon fired and several in her company were killed. A minor French military success at Haddington on 17 July 1548 was known as "Tuesday's Chase".

Although Mary was sent to France in August 1548, the war continued. Scottish fortresses including Dunbar Castle were transferred to French keepers at this time, Camillo Marini was made Captain of Blackness Castle in 1549. For a time, in the years 1548 and 1549, Scotland seems to have become almost a protectorate of Henry II of France.

John Knox was critical of the proceedings at Haddington, and later wrote that "French soldiers were the officers of arms in that Parliament".

== Parliamentary record ==
The Parliamentary register recorded the meeting at Haddington Abbey with these words in the Scots Language:

The quenis grace, our soverane ladyis maist derrest mother, being present, my lord governour and thre estatis of parliament foirsaid, all in ane voice, hes fundin and decernit and, be censement of parliament, concludit the desyre of the said Monsieur Dessy, lieutennent in name of the said Maist Christin King, his maister, (Monsiour Dosell his ambassadour present in the said parliament confirmand the samin) verray ressonabill and hes grantit that our said soverane lady be maryit with the said Dolphin at hir perfyte age, and presentlie gevis thair consent thairto, swa that the said King of France keip, manteine and defend this realme, liegis of the samin, liberteis and lawis thairof as he dois his awin realme of France and liegis of the samin, and as this realme hes bene keipit, mantenit and defendit be the nobil kingis of Scotland in tymes bypast conforme to the promit of the said lieutennent, speciall commissar in the said cause, and that our soverane lady be maryit upone na uther persoun bot upone the said Dolphin allanerlie

The Queen's Grace, our sovereign lady's dearest mother [Mary of Guise], being present, my Lord Governor and the Three Estates of Parliament foresaid, all in one voice, has found and discerned and, by its judgement, concluded the desire of the said André de Montalembert, Monsieur D'Essé, lieutenant in name of the Most Christian King, his master [Henry II of France], (Monsieur D'Oisel his ambassador present in the parliament confirming the same) to be very reasonable, and has granted that our Sovereign Lady [Mary, Queen of Scots] be married with the said Dauphin [Francis] at her perfect age [majority year], and presently gives their consent thereto, so that the said king of France keep, maintain and defend this realm, the lieges of the same, liberties and thereof, as he does his own realm of France and lieges of the same, and as this realm has been kept, maintained and defended by the noble king's of Scotland in times bypast conforming to the promise of the said Lieutenant [D'Essé], special commissar in the said cause, and that our sovereign lady be married to none other person but the said Dauphin only.
