= Cornton =

Area of Stirling, Scotland

Coordinates: 56.135°N 3.939°W

Cornton: Scottish Gaelic: Bhaile-Coirce; Scots: Corton, Cody
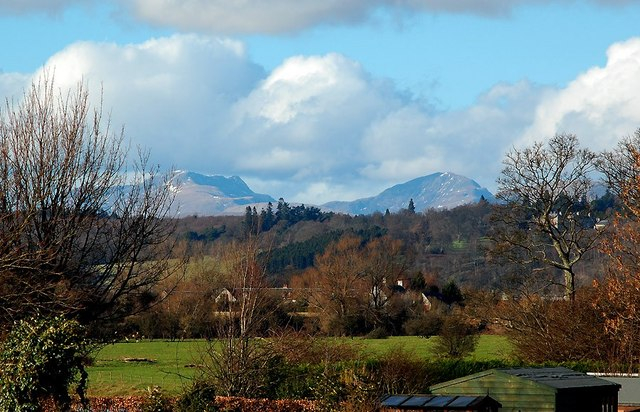
- Netherton Farm and Lochearnhead hills, viewed north-west from Cornton

- Location within the Stirling council area
- OS grid reference: NS794952
- Civil parish: Logie
- Council area: Stirling
- Lieutenancy area: Stirling and Falkirk
- Country: Scotland
- Sovereign state: United Kingdom
- Post town: STIRLING
- Postcode district: FK9
- Dialling code: 01786
- Police: Scotland
- Fire: Scottish
- Ambulance: Scottish
- UK Parliament: Stirling
- Scottish Parliament: Stirling

Cornton, known locally as The Cornton, is a district of the city of Stirling on the North Bank of the River Forth in central Scotland.

== History ==
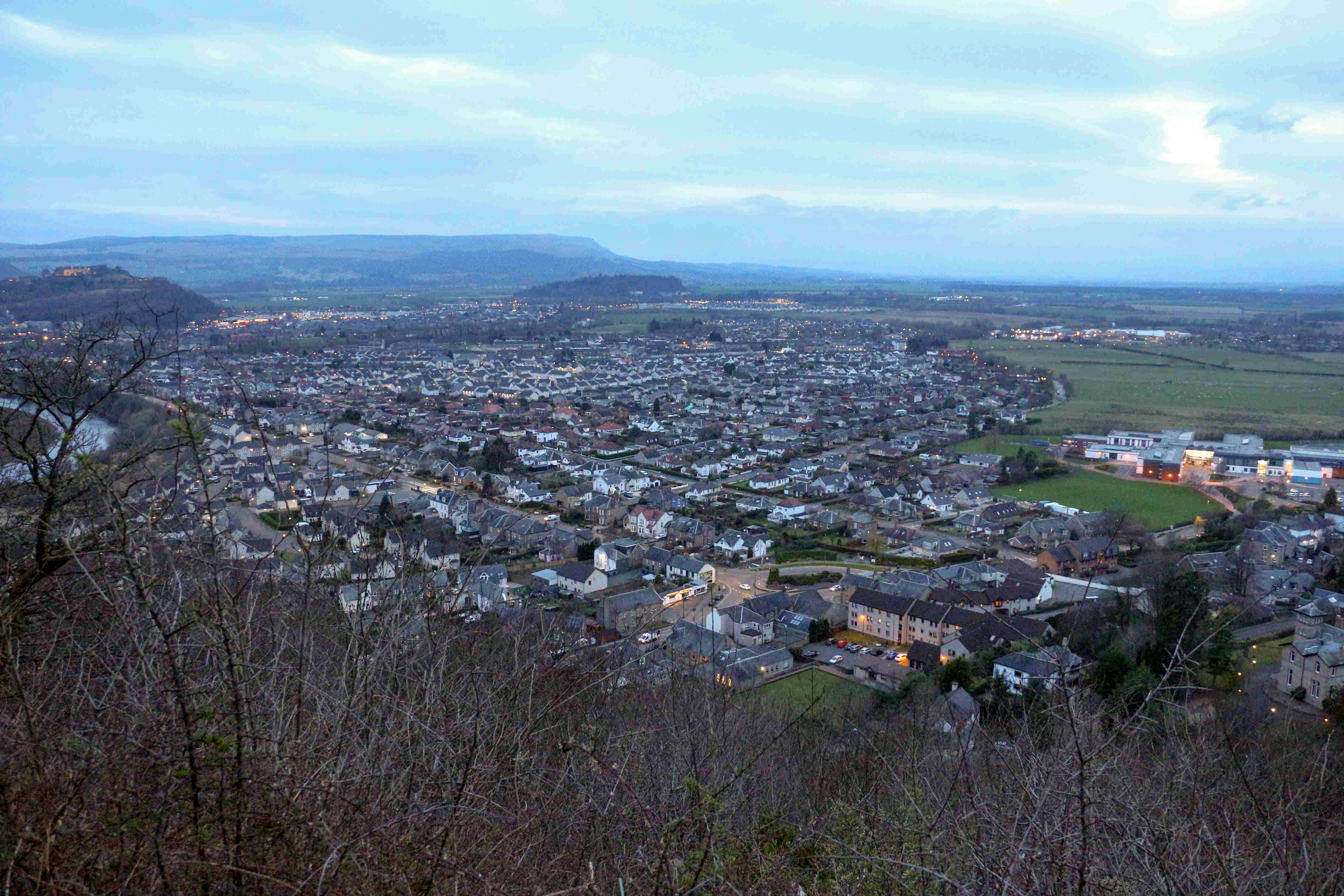
Early evening in Cornton, in 2023.

It is amongst the oldest of Stirling settlements originating in Pre-Roman times and servicing the ford marked by the Causewayhead Road. The area that is now the Cornton and on the opposite bank, the Raploch, were the only available patches of agricultural land prior to draining programs of later eras. Wallace´s Battle of Stirling Bridge took place on and around the site of the present housing estate and although there is no clear marker anywhere to inform the adventurous visitor, the dominant position of the Abbey Craig indicates the natural route to the battle scene.

The original bridge was anecdotally regarded as being positioned at least fifty metres up stream from the present location of the medieval bridge and archaeological dives in the last century provided evidence of the original piers of a previous bridge.

The Cornton was home to the only all woman's prison in Scotland, Cornton Vale. The prison, built in 1975, was located north of the housing area, close to the River Forth. It was demolished in 2020 and a new prison "HMP & YOI Stirling" was opened in 2023 slightly further north. It is now one of three locations in Scotland where women are held in custody.

The most famous former Cornton resident is the jockey Willie Carson. The nurse of Mary, Queen of Scots, Jean Sinclair, was granted lands at Cornton as a reward for her services.
