= Jean Hotman (goldsmith) =

Jean or Jehan Hotman (died 1555) was a Parisian goldsmith who worked for King Francis I of France.

== Career ==
He was a son of the goldsmith Guillaume Hotman. Pierre Mangot and Jean Hotman probably supplied the many gifts given by Francis I to Henry VIII and his courtiers at the Field of the Cloth of Gold in 1520. Thibault Hotman, another goldsmith serving the French court, was his brother..

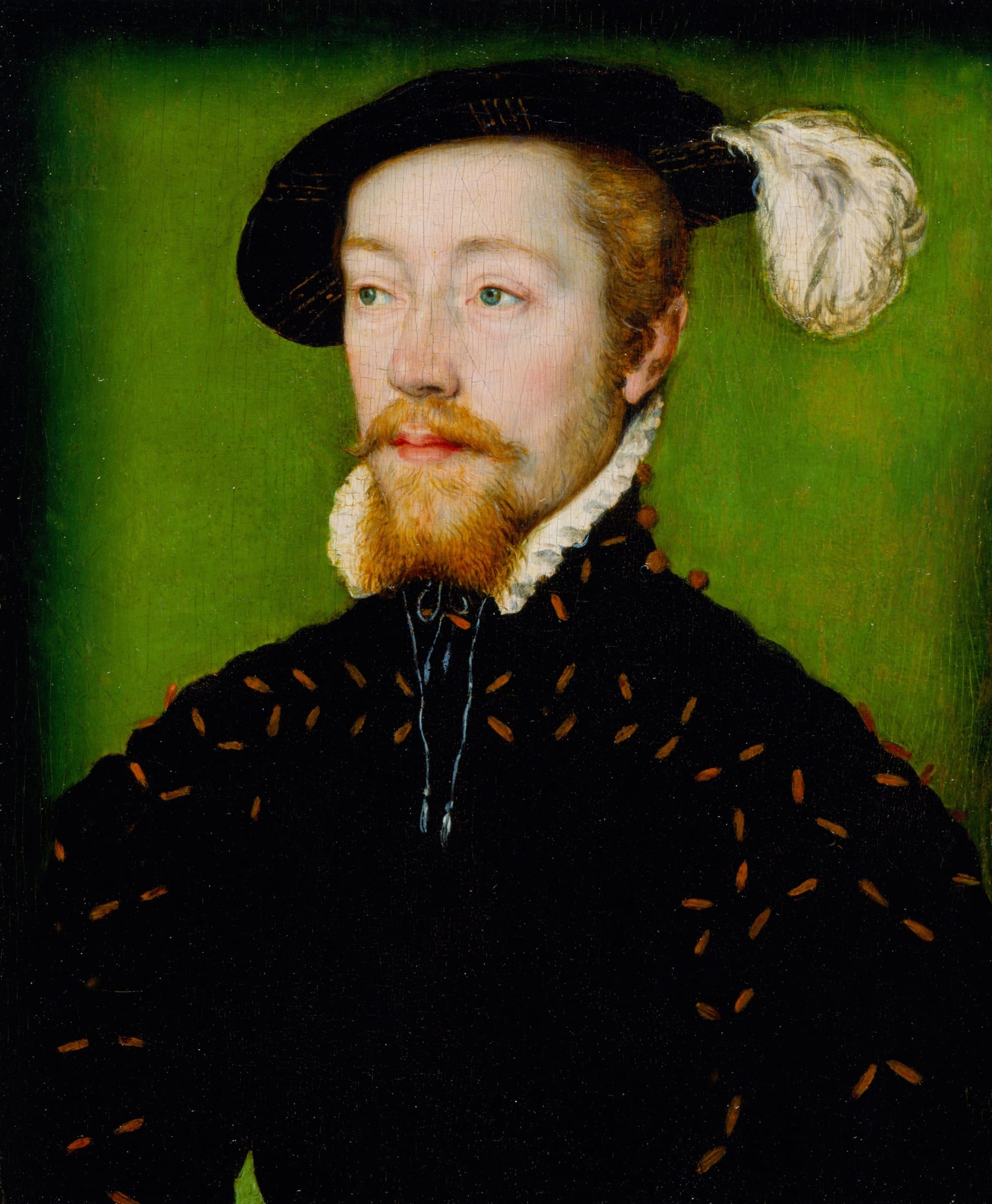
James V of Scotland was a customer of Jean, Pierre, and Thibault Hotman

Hotman made or provided a number of diplomatic gifts including gifts for John Clerk, Bishop of Bath, and the retinue of Cardinal Wolsey in 1527, a gold cup presented to the English diplomat Thomas Boleyn in 1534, and gold and silver gilt vessels given to the Dukes of Norfolk and Suffolk at the Calais interview in October 1532, and gilt plate to Francis Bryan an envoy to France in 1532. He provided cupboards of silver gilt plate given by Francis I to the English envoy Francis Poyntz in November 1527. and to David Beaton, a Scottish diplomat who negotiated the marriages of James V,

Some payments to Hotman were made to his factor or commis Antoine le Bossu. Jean Hotman had premises at the Pont au Change in Paris. He purchased several portions of a property in Paris known as the Maison des Balances in the Rue de la Calandre from booksellers.

== Jewels for the King of Scotland ==
When James V visited France in 1536–1537, according to an agent of George Douglas, his enthusiasm for shopping in person in Paris was noted with amusement by the merchant community. He appointed Hotman as his goldsmith. Thibault Hotman supplied silver gilt plate for his bride Madeleine of Valois.

James V visited merchants and workshops in France and gave tips of money (known as "drinksilver") to the craftsmen and apprentices. The Scottish treasurer's accounts detail a number of works provided to James V by the Hotmans including the three gold cups which James V gave to Francis I, Eleanor of Austria and the Grand Master Anne de Montmorency, buttons, gold thistles, and other dress accessories, plates and candlesticks, a silver gilt nef, and silver plate for the royal chapel. Two "target" brooches and some buttons and fastenings costing 41 Francs were delivered to James's pursemaster Henry Kemp, who looked after the king's hats.

James V wore some of the jewels and a set of azure enamelled buttons for his Royal Entry to Paris. Although John Penman, the agent of George Douglas, wrote that his spending had "beggared all Scotland", the king's purchases were in part funded by the dowry provided by Francis I.

== Pierre Hotman ==
Jean Hotman was survived by his widow Thomasse Le Lorraine. Their children included Pierre Hotman, sieur de Fontenay. Pierre Hotman was also a goldsmith. In 1571, Claude of Valois, Duchess of Lorraine, asked him to send her some dolls "as well-clothed as he could find", with a set of miniature silver plates for a buffet, intended as a present for Christine, the new-born daughter of Renata of Lorraine, Duchess of Bavaria.
