= André de Montalembert =

French nobleman (1483–1553)

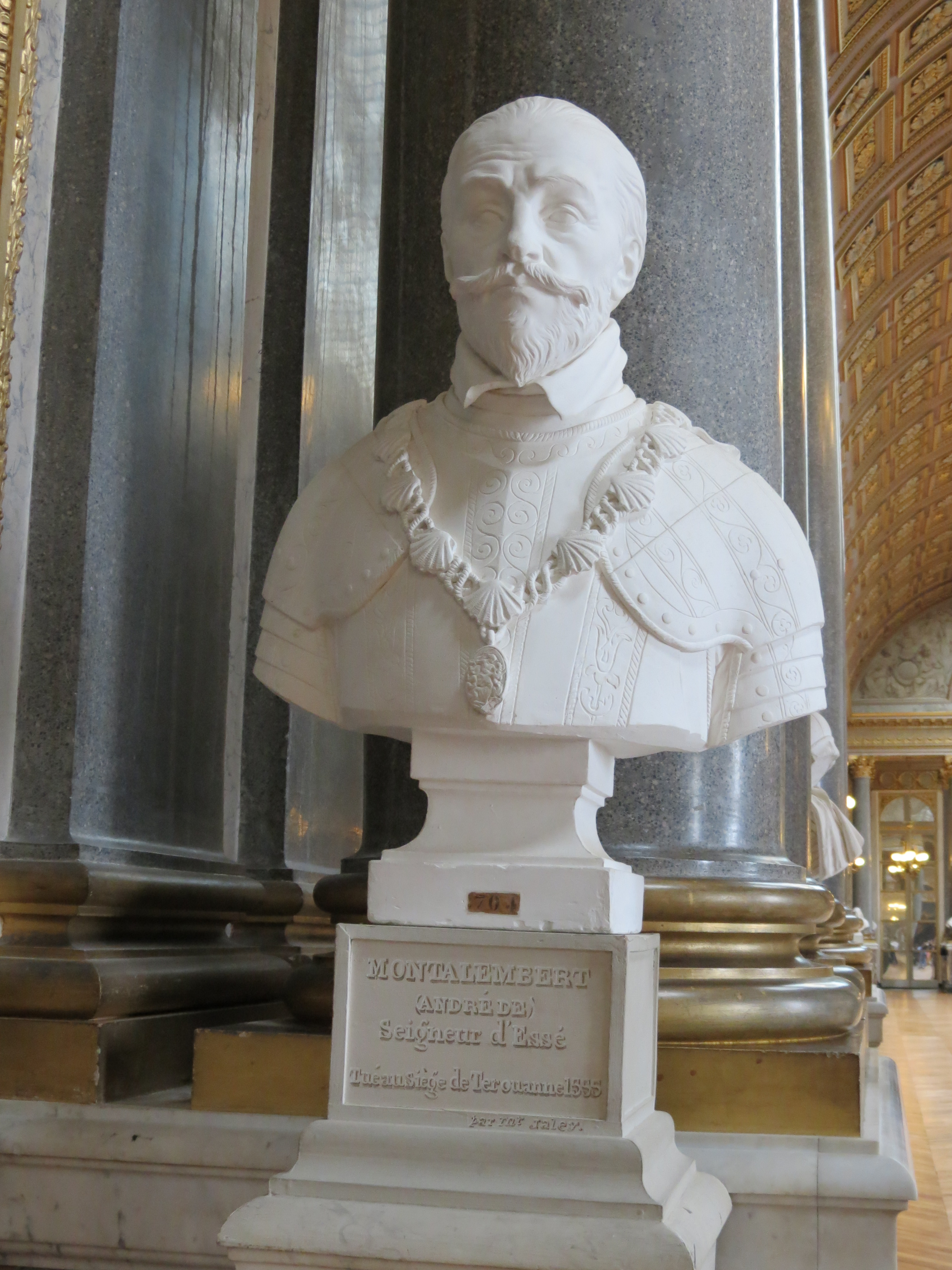
Bust of Andre de Montalembert

André de Montalembert (1483–1553), Seigneur d'Essé, was a French nobleman and officer of the 16th century. As a young boy he fought in the Italian Wars. When King Francis I met with Henry VIII of England at the Field of the Cloth of Gold in 1520, he chose Montalembert as one of his three brothers-in-arms in the accompanying tournaments.

== Constantinople ==
France allied with the Ottoman Empire in 1536 against the Habsburgs. In 1542, André de Montalembert was sent to Constantinople to assess However, Sultan Suleiman, partly under the anti-alliance influence of Suleyman Pasha, was unwilling to send an army that year, and promised to send an army twice as strong the following year, in 1543.

== Scotland ==
In 1548, he was sent at the head of 6,000 men to Scotland to support Regent Arran against England in the war known as the Rough Wooing. There he became well known, usually as d'Essé, Lieutenant-General of the Army and Navy. On 7 July 1548, D'Essé addressed Parliament at Haddington Abbey, proposing the marriage of Mary, Queen of Scots to the Dauphin. The Scots unanimously agreed to this in the Treaty of Haddington.

The nearby town of Haddington had been occupied and fortified by the English. D'Essé took charge of the on-going Siege of Haddington. In October 1548 he suffered a reverse with a failed night attack on the town. A notable success for d'Essé was his capture of Inchkeith on 20 June 1549.

In July 1549, he was relieved by Paul de la Barthe, sieur de Termes. He returned to France in triumph and presented seven captured English banners to King Henry II of France. A diplomat reported, "Yesterday five banners taken by the French and Scots from the English were presented to the King. They were surprised and defeated in an ambush on the island they call Horse Island (Inchkeith) towards Scotland. The King has made a great fuss and rejoicing over it, and given 100 crowns each to the soldiers who brought him the banners, and three payments of 12 crowns each a year for the rest of their lives. The captain received 100 crowns." For his service in Scotland, d'Essé was made a knight of the Order of Saint Michael.

== Death ==
He died at the siege of Therouanne in 1553.
