= Mathurin Lussault =

French goldsmith

Mathurin Lussault (died 1572) was a French goldsmith based in Paris who supplied the royal family and Mary, Queen of Scots.

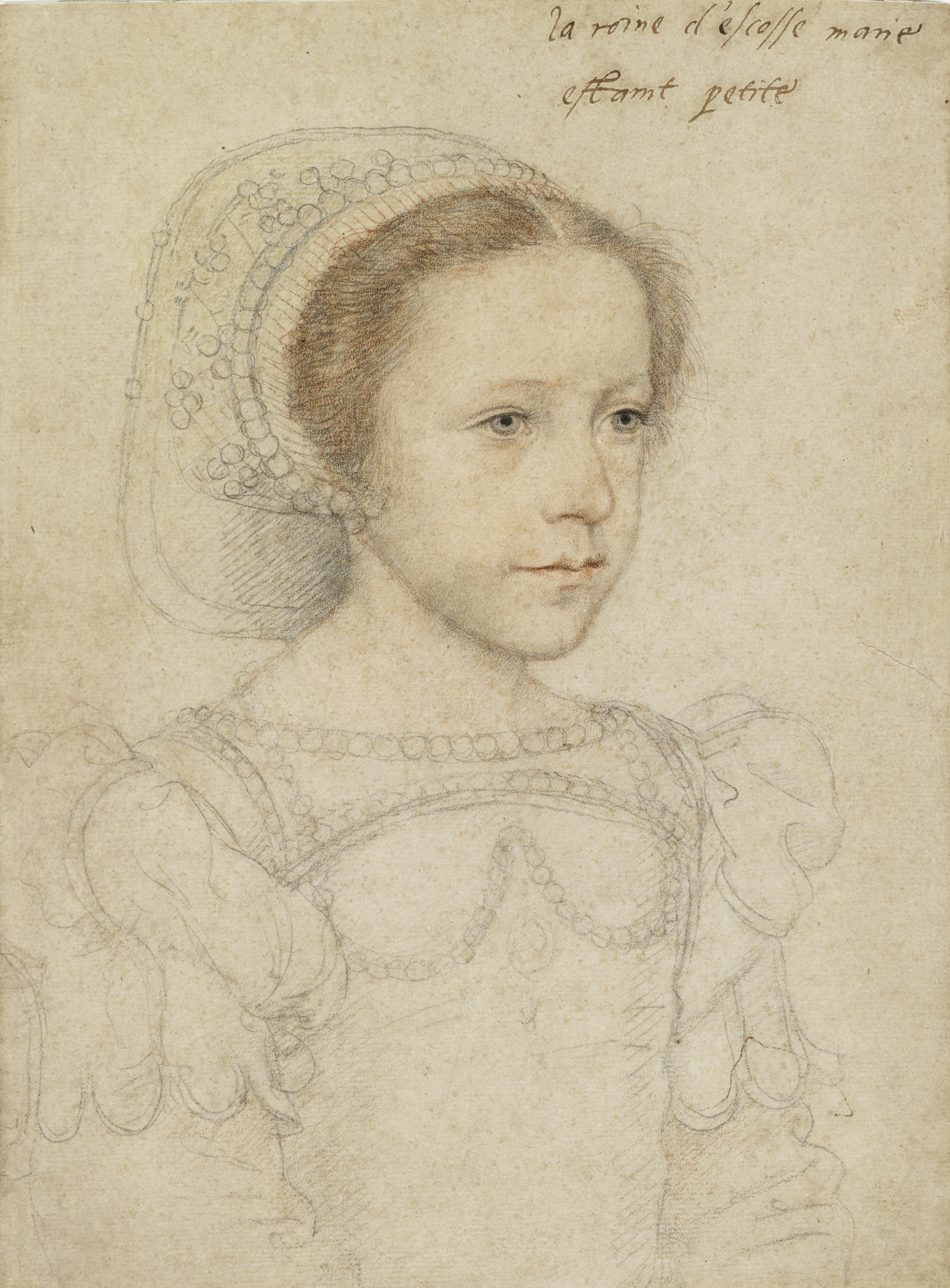
Mathurin Lussault supplied Mary, Queen of Scots with luxury goods in France

Lussault was described as a "goldsmith who follows the court" and merchant goldsmith or goldsmith in ordinary to Catherine de' Medici. He made jetons or counters engraved with her arms and ciphers for use in her counting house.

Lussault provided Mary, Queen of Scots, with gloves, pins, combs, and brushes in 1551. An note in an inventory of the jewels of Mary, Queen of Scots, records that Lussault was given a string of 36 pearls in July 1556 to make nine entredeux pieces for a sapphire collar.

By the time of Mary's marriage, to the future Francis II of France in 1558, Lussault was known as Mary's goldsmith. Other goldsmiths who worked for the wedding ensemble were; Pierre Vast, Michel Fauré and Claude Héry merchants in Lyon, Jean Joly, Jean Doublet (the Dauphin's goldsmith), and Nicolas Vara, a gilder and engraver.

In 1564, Lussault was described as the goldsmith of Catherine de' Medici. He was a patron of the sculptor Ponce Jacquiot, who designed a fireplace for his house in the Rue St Germain-l'Auxerrois in Paris.

Mathurin Lussault was killed in Paris during the St. Bartholomew's Day massacre along with his wife Françoise Baillet and son Jacques or Laurent and a female servant. Lussault was stabbed at his front door by a gold wire maker, Thomas Croizier. A gold watch found on the body of his son was sold to the Duke of Anjou, and his wife's hands were cut off to remove her gold bracelets.
