= Henry Kemp of Thomastoun =

16th-century Scottish courtier

Henry Kemp of Thomastoun was a Scottish courtier.

== Career ==
Henry or Harry Kemp was a yeoman of the king's chamber and the pursemaster of James V of Scotland. He accompanied the king and made payments for him and handed out tips and rewards. The royal treasurer's accounts include various payments to Kemp for the purse. On 26 May 1526 he received £20 in the tennis court at Stirling Castle.

His land were at Thomastoun, near Cupar in Fife, Scotland.

In April 1532, Kemp spent £20 Scots on the expenses of keeping James Stewart, the infant son of James V and Elizabeth Schaw, and his nurse's wages.

Kemp had custody of some of the king's rings and jewels, his gold combs and toothpick, and a number of velvet bonnets. The hats and bonnets wee decorated with gold buttons and badges, enamelled and set with diamonds.

James V died at Falkland Palace on 14 December 1542. A will and testament of the king was generally regarded as forged or invalid. A copy was preserved by Regent Arran. Dated 14 December 1542 in the king's bedchamber at Falkland, it was witnessed by James Learmonth of Dairsie, Master Household; Henry Kemp of Thomastoun; Michael Durham, the king's doctor; John Tennent, William Kirkcaldy of Grange, Master Michael Dysart, Preceptor of St Anthony's at Leith; John Jordan, Rector of Yetham; Francis Aikman, perfumerer, and others at the bedside.

Kemp was "customer" of Fife in 1554, in charge of collecting customs and duties for the crown.

== Family ==
Kemp married Janet Durie, daughter and heiress of Robert Durie of Durie, and subsequently adopted the surname Durie. Janet Durie was forced to marry Kemp by James V. Their daughter, Janet Durie, married Andrew Wardlaw, a son of Henry Wardlaw of Torrie, in 1562.
