= Art in early modern Scotland =

Self portrait of George Jamesone, 1642

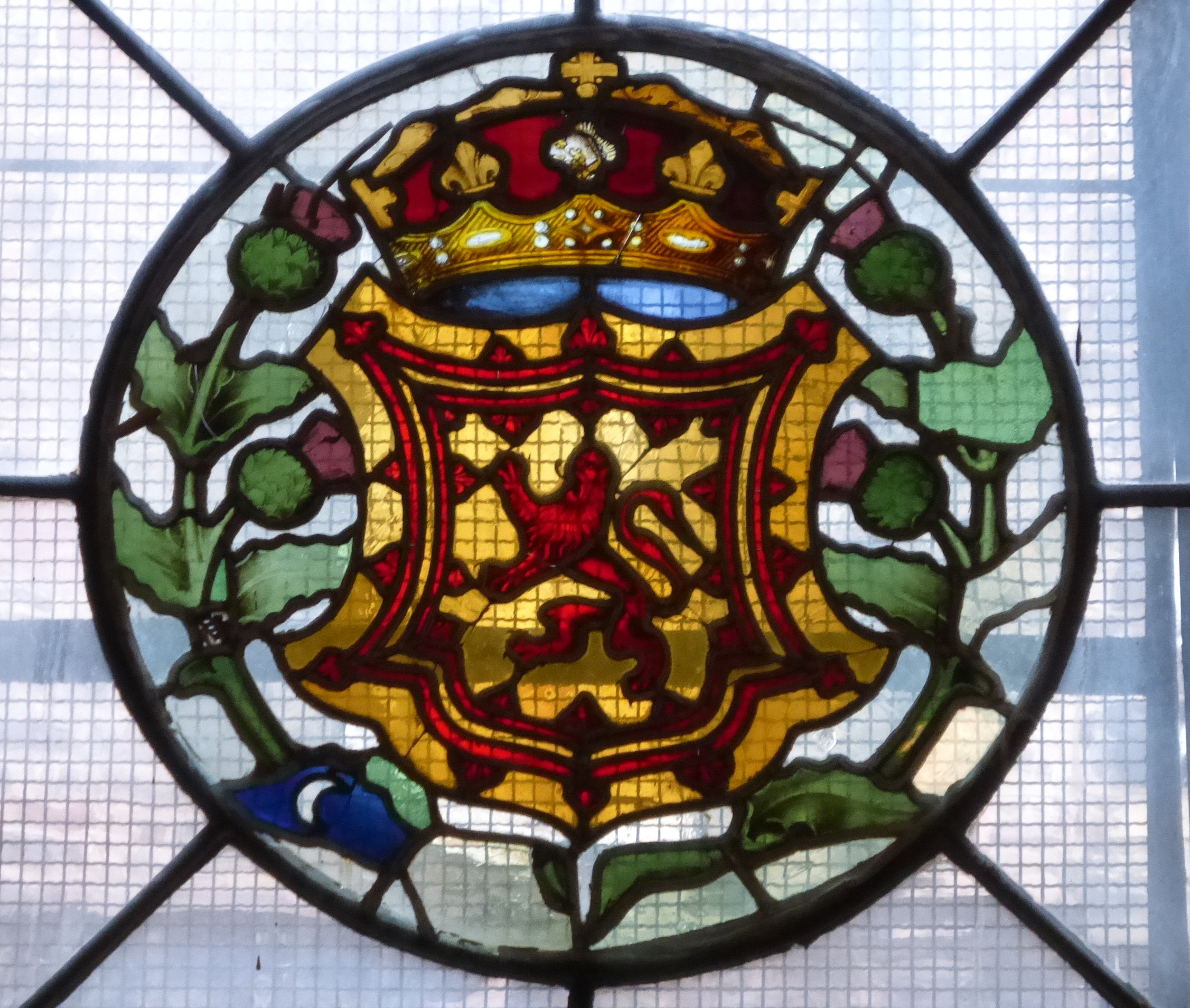
Rare example of pre-Reformation stained glass in the Magdalen Chapel, Edinburgh

Art in early modern Scotland includes all forms of artistic production within the modern borders of Scotland, between the adoption of the Renaissance in the early sixteenth century to the beginnings of the Enlightenment in the mid-eighteenth century.

Devotional art before the Reformation included books and images commissioned in the Netherlands. Before the Reformation in the mid-sixteenth century the interiors of Scottish churches were often elaborate and colourful, with sacrament houses and monumental effigies. Scotland's ecclesiastical art paid a heavy toll as a result of Reformation iconoclasm, with the almost total loss of medieval stained glass, religious sculpture and paintings.

In about 1500 the Scottish monarchy turned to the recording of royal likenesses in panel portraits. More impressive are the works or artists imported from the continent, particularly the Netherlands. The tradition of royal portrait painting in Scotland was probably disrupted by the minorities and regencies it underwent for much of the sixteenth century, but it flourished after the Reformation. James VI employed Flemish artists Arnold Bronckorst and Adrian Vanson, who have left behind a visual record of the king and major figures at the court. The first significant native artist was George Jamesone, who was succeeded by a series of portrait painters as the fashion moved down the social scale to lairds and burgesses.

The loss of ecclesiastical patronage that resulted from the Reformation created a crisis for native craftsmen and artists, who turned to secular patrons. One result of this was the flourishing of Scottish Renaissance painted ceilings and walls. Other forms of domestic decoration included tapestries and stone and wood carving. In the first half of the eighteenth century there was an increasing professionalisation and organisation of art. Large numbers of artists took the grand tour to Italy. The Academy of St. Luke was founded as a society for artists in 1729. It included among its members Allan Ramsay, who emerged as one of the most important British artists of the era.

== Devotional art ==
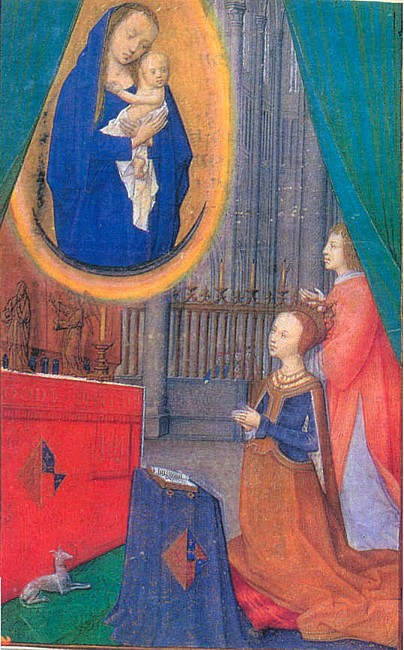
A page from the Hours of James IV of Scotland

Devotional art acquired from the Netherlands in the later fifteenth and early sixteenth centuries included the images of St Catherine and St John brought to Dunkeld; Hugo van Der Goes's altarpiece for the Trinity College Church in Edinburgh, commissioned by James III, and the work after which the Flemish Master of James IV of Scotland is named. There are also a relatively large number of elaborate devotional books from the late fifteenth and early sixteenth centuries, usually produced in the Netherlands and France for Scottish patrons. These include the prayer book commissioned by Robert Blackadder, Bishop of Glasgow, between 1484 and 1492 and the Flemish illustrated book of hours, known as the Hours of James IV of Scotland, given by James IV to Margaret Tudor after 1503 and described by D. H. Caldwell as "perhaps the finest medieval manuscript to have been commissioned for Scottish use".

Before the Reformation in the mid-sixteenth century the interiors of Scottish churches were often elaborate and colourful. Particularly in the north-east of the country there were highly decorated sacrament houses, like the ones surviving at Kinkell from 1524 and Deskford from 1541. Monumental effigies in churches were usually fully coloured and gilded and dedicated to members of the clergy, knights and their wives. In contrast to England, where the fashion for stone-carved monuments gave way to monumental brasses, in Scotland they continued to be produced until the end of the Medieval period. These include the very elaborate Douglas tombs in the town of Douglas and the tomb built for Alexander McLeod (d. 1528) at Rodel in Harris. Scotland's ecclesiastical art paid a heavy toll as a result of Reformation iconoclasm, with the almost total loss of medieval stained glass, religious sculpture and paintings. The only significant surviving pre-Reformation stained glass in Scotland is a window of four roundels in the St. Magdalen Chapel of Cowgate, Edinburgh, completed in 1544. Wood carving can be seen at King's College, Aberdeen and Dunblane Cathedral. In the West Highlands, where there had been a hereditary caste of monumental sculptors, the uncertainty and loss of patronage caused by the rejection of monuments in the Reformation meant that they moved into another branches of the Gaelic learned orders or took up other occupations. The lack of transfer of carving skills is noticeable in the decline in quality when gravestones were next commissioned from the start of the seventeenth century. According to N. Prior, the nature of the Scottish Reformation may have had wider effects, limiting the creation of a culture of public display and meaning that art was channelled into more austere forms of expression with an emphasis on private and domestic restraint.

== Portraiture ==
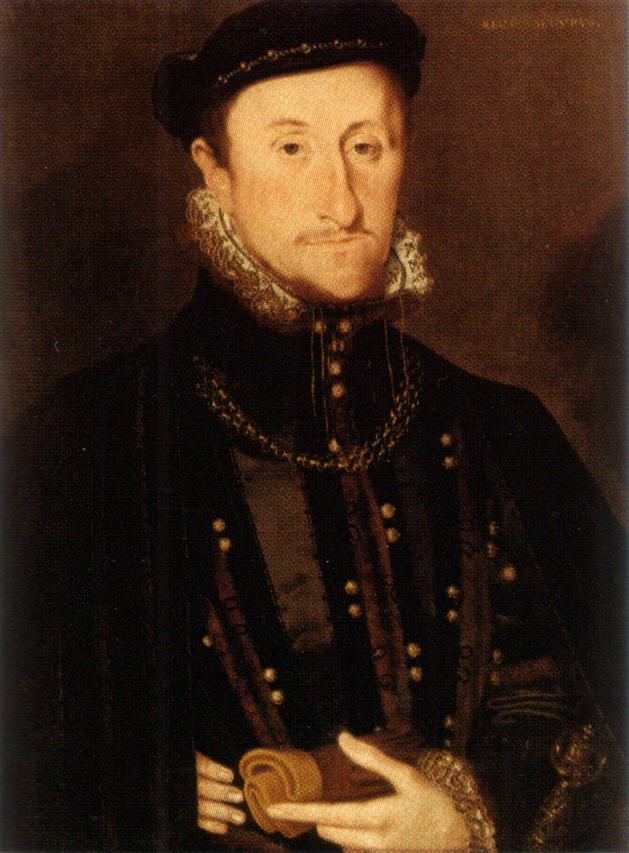
James Stewart, 1st Earl of Moray by Hans Eworth

Around 1500, about the same time as in England, Scottish monarchs turned to the recording of royal likenesses in panel portraits, painted in oils on wood, perhaps as a form of political expression. In 1502 James IV paid for delivery of portraits of the Tudor household, probably by the "Inglishe payntour" named "Mynours," who stayed in Scotland to paint the king and his new bride Margaret Tudor the following year. "Mynours" was Maynard Wewyck, a Flemish painter who usually worked for Henry VII in London. As in England, the monarchy may have had model portraits of royalty used for copies and reproductions, but the versions of native royal portraits that survive are generally crude by continental standards. Much more impressive are the works or artists imported from the continent, particularly the Netherlands, generally considered the centre of painting in the Northern Renaissance. The products of these connections included a fine portrait of William Elphinstone. It is one of the earliest representations of a Scottish subject to survive and was probably painted by a Scots artist using Flemish techniques. The tradition of royal portrait painting in Scotland was disrupted by the minorities and regencies it underwent for much of the sixteenth century. In his majority James V was probably more concerned with architectural expressions of royal identity. Mary Queen of Scots had been brought up in the French court, where she was drawn and painted by major European artists, but she did not commission any adult portraits, with the exception of the joint portrait with her second husband Henry Stuart, Lord Darnley. This may have reflected an historic Scottish pattern, where heraldic display or an elaborate tomb were considered more important than a portrait.

Portraiture began to flourish after the Reformation. There were anonymously painted portraits of important individuals, including miniatures of James Hepburn, 4th Earl of Bothwell and his wife Jean Gordon (1556). Artists from the Low Countries remained important. Hans Eworth, who had been court painter to Mary I of England, painted a number of Scottish subjects in the 1560s. He painted James Stewart, 1st Earl of Moray in 1561 and two years later he painted a joint portrait of the young Darnley and his brother Charles Stuart. Lord Seton, Master of the Royal Household commissioned two portraits in the Netherlands in the 1570s, one of himself and one a family portrait. A specific type of Scottish picture is the "vendetta portrait", designed to keep alive the memory of an atrocity. Examples include the Darlney memorial portrait, which shows the young James IV kneeling at his murdered father's tomb and the lifesize portrait of the corpse of The Bonnie Early of Moray vividly showing the wounds received by James Stewart, 2nd Earl of Moray when he was killed by George Gordon, 1st Marquess of Huntly in 1592.

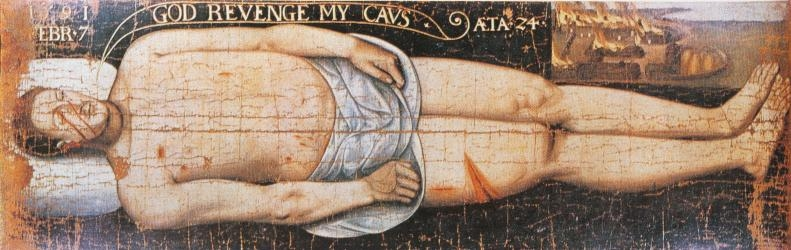
The Bonnie Earl of Moray, anonymous "vendetta portrait" of the murdered James Stewart, 2nd Earl of Moray, 1592 (1591 Old Style)

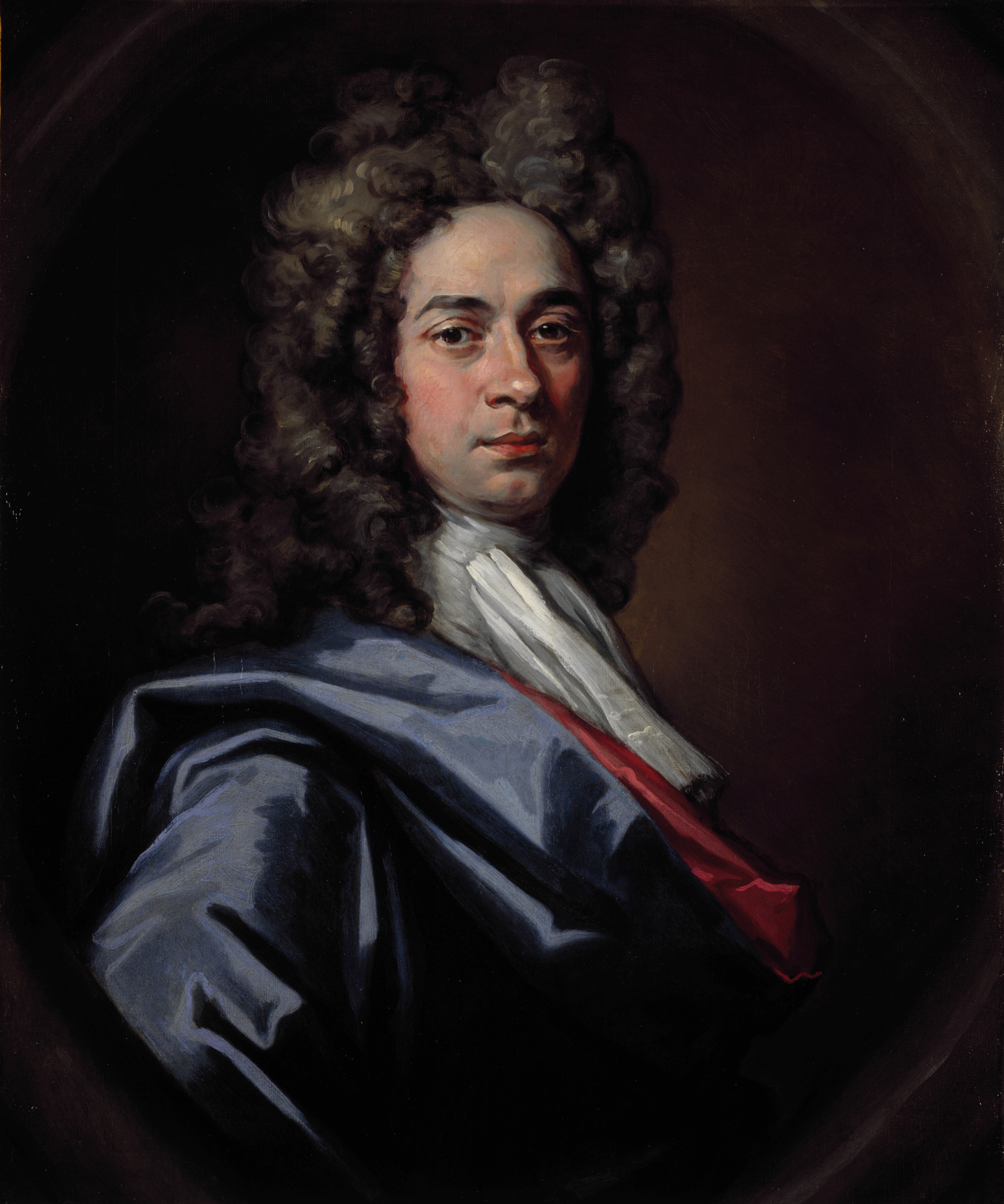
Self portrait by John Baptist Medina (c. 1698)

There was an attempt to produce a series of portraits of Scottish kings in panel portraits, probably for the royal entry of the fifteen-year-old James VI in 1579, which are Medieval in form. In James VI's personal reign, Renaissance forms of portraiture began to dominate. He employed two Flemish artists, Arnold Bronckorst in the early 1580s and Adrian Vanson from around 1584 to 1602, who have left us a visual record of the king and major figures at the court. However, the Union of Crowns in 1603 removed a major source of artistic patronage in Scotland as James VI and his court moved to London. The result has been seen as a shift "from crown to castle", as the nobility and local lairds became the major sources of patronage.

By the seventeenth century the fashion for portraiture had spread down the social order to lairds such as Colin Campbell of Glenorchy and John Napier of Merchiston. The first significant native artist was George Jamesone of Aberdeen (1589/90-1644), who, having trained in the Netherlands, became one of the most successful portrait painters of the reign of Charles I. He trained the Baroque artist John Michael Wright (1617–94), who painted both Scottish and English subjects. The Flemish-Spanish painter John Baptist Medina (1659–1710) came to Scotland in 1693 and became the leading Scottish portrait painter of his generation. Among his best known works are a group of about 30 oval bust-lengths, including a self-portrait, in Surgeons' Hall, Edinburgh. He trained his son, also John, and William Aikman (1682–1731), who became the leading portrait painter of the next generation. Aikman migrated to London in 1723, and from this point until the late eighteenth century, most Scottish painters of note followed him.

== Domestic decoration ==
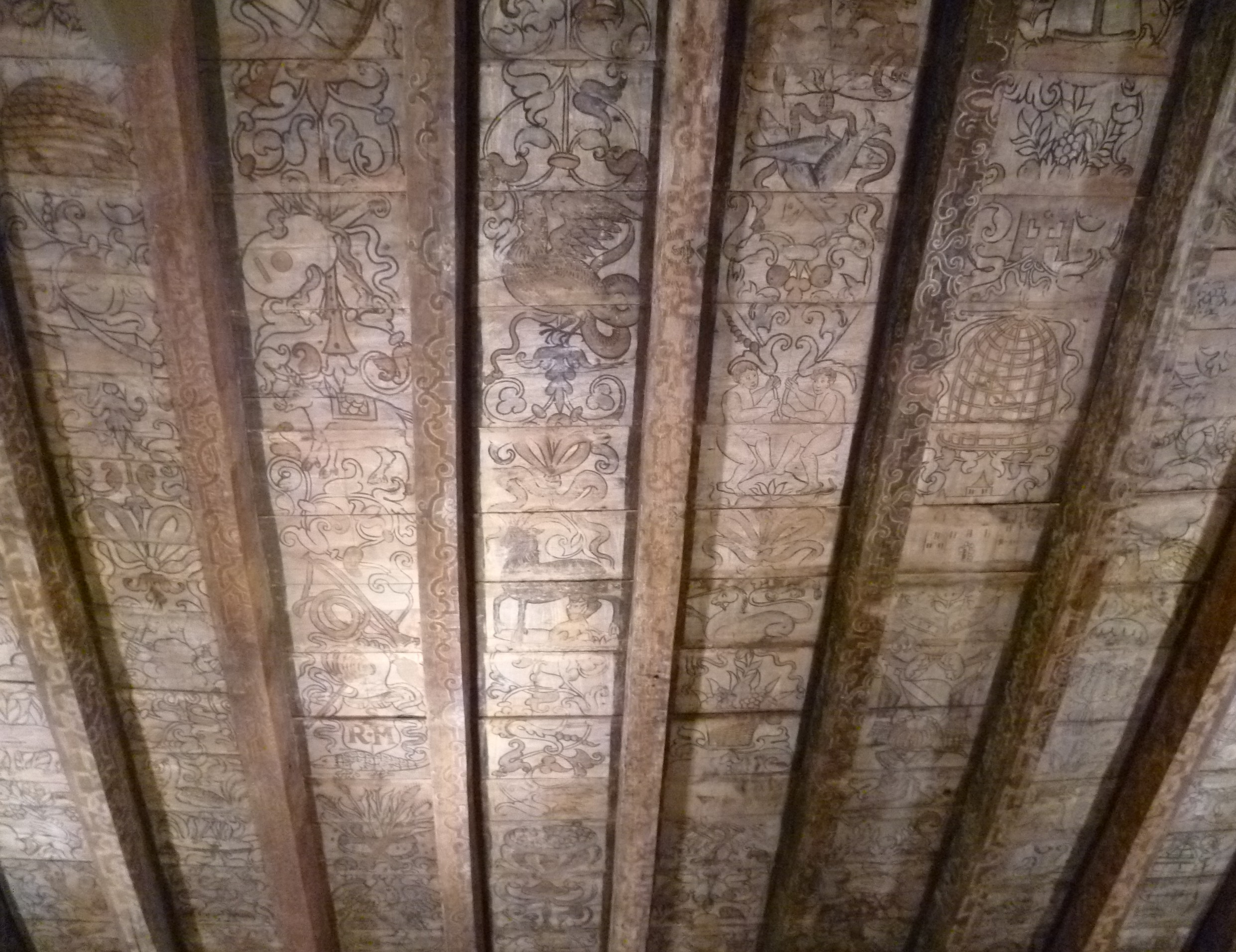
Painted ceiling from Rossend Castle, Burntisland

The loss of ecclesiastical patronage that resulted from the Reformation, created a crisis for native craftsmen and artists, who turned to secular patrons. One result of this was the flourishing of Scottish Renaissance painted ceilings and walls, with large numbers of private houses of burgesses, lairds and lords gaining often highly detailed and coloured patterns and scenes, of which over a hundred examples are known to have existed. These were undertaken by unnamed Scottish artists using continental pattern books that often led to the incorporation of humanist moral and philosophical symbolism, with elements that call on heraldry, piety, classical myths and allegory. The earliest surviving example is at the Hamilton palace of Kinneil, West Lothian, decorated in the 1550s for the then regent the James Hamilton, Earl of Arran. Other examples include the ceiling at Prestongrange House, undertaken in 1581 for Mark Kerr, Commendator of Newbattle, and the long gallery at Pinkie House, painted for Alexander Seton, Earl of Dunfermline in 1621.

Some furniture was painted, and James VI commissioned a decorative painter, James Workman to make a board for playing the Game of the Goose. Records indicate that Scottish palaces were adorned by rich tapestries, like those that depicted scenes from the Iliad and Odyssey set up for James IV at Holyrood. Some of this was undertaken by exclusive professional embroiders, but needlework was part of female education at all levels of society. Some of these tapestries were produced by noble ladies, such as the bed valances made by Katherine Ruthven for her marriage in 1551 to Campbell of Glenorchy. These are the oldest surviving examples of Scottish produced embroidery. They display the couple's initials, arms and the story of Adam and Eve. A carpet designed to cover a table may be connected to the marriage of Katherine Oliphant, which has her initials, arms, biblical verses and (perhaps as a pun on her name) an elephant. Much of the needle work of the sixteenth century has been attributed, probably erroneously, to Mary, Queen of Scots. It is thought that she did contribute to the Oxburgh Hangings while imprisoned in England.

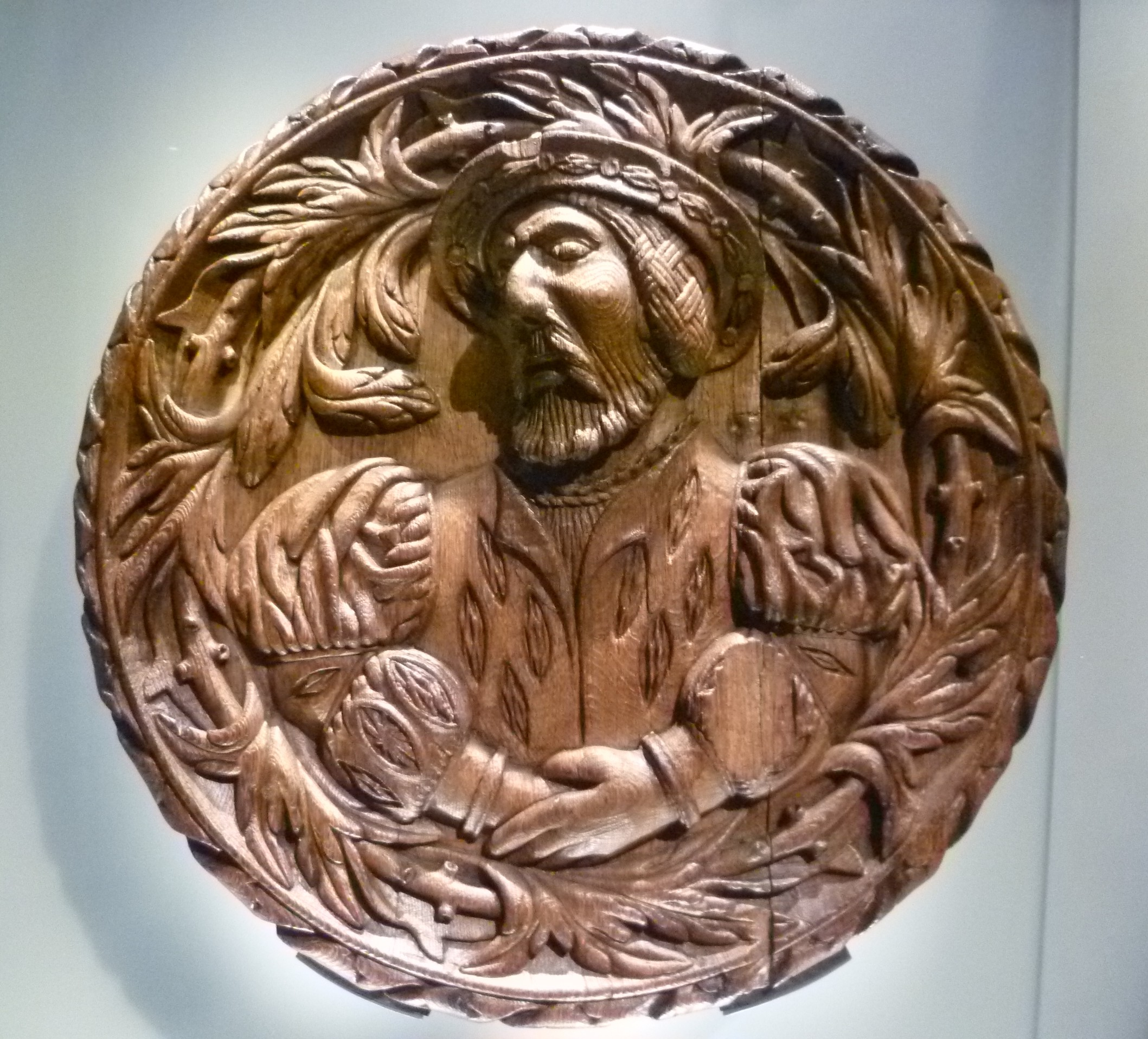
King James V in one of the Stirling Heads

Although tradition of stone and wood carving in churches largely ended at the Reformation, it continued in royal palaces, the great houses of the nobility and even the humbler homes of lairds and burgesses. The intricate lid of the fourteenth-century Bute mazer, carved from a single piece of whale bone, was probably created in the early sixteenth century. At Stirling Castle, stone carvings on the royal palace from the reign of James V are taken from German patterns, and, like the surviving carved oak portrait roundels from the King's Presence Chamber, known as the Stirling Heads, they include contemporary, biblical and classical figures. These, and the elaborate Renaissance fountain at Linlithgow Palace (c. 1538.), suggest that there was a workshop with an established connected with the court in the early sixteenth century. James V and his successors employed a versatile French craftsman and wood carver, Andrew Mansioun, who settled in Edinburgh and trained apprentices.

Some of the finest domestic wood carving is in the Beaton panels made for Arbroath Abbey and at Huntly Castle, rebuilt for George Gordon, 1st Marquess of Huntly in the early seventeenth century, which focused on heraldic images. Their "popish" overtones led to them being damaged by an occupying Covenanter army in 1640. From the seventeenth century, as domestic architecture for the nobility was increasingly for comfort, rather than fortification, there was elaborate use of carving in carved pediments, fireplaces, heraldic arms and classical motifs. Plasterwork also began to be used, often depicting flowers and cherubs. Richly carved decoration on ordinary houses was common in the period. There is also the heraldic carving, such as the royal arms at Holyrood Palace, designed by the Dutch painter Jacob de Wet in 1677. The tradition of carving also survived in work like the carved stone panels in the garden of Edzell Castle (c. 1600), the now lost carving done for Edinburgh and Glasgow universities in the seventeenth-century and in the many elaborate sundials of the seventeenth century, like those at Newbattle.

== Professionalisation of art ==
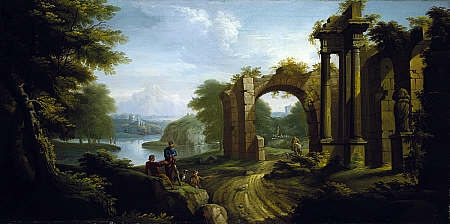
A capriccio by James Nories senior (1684–1757), credited with originating the tradition of landscape painting in Scotland

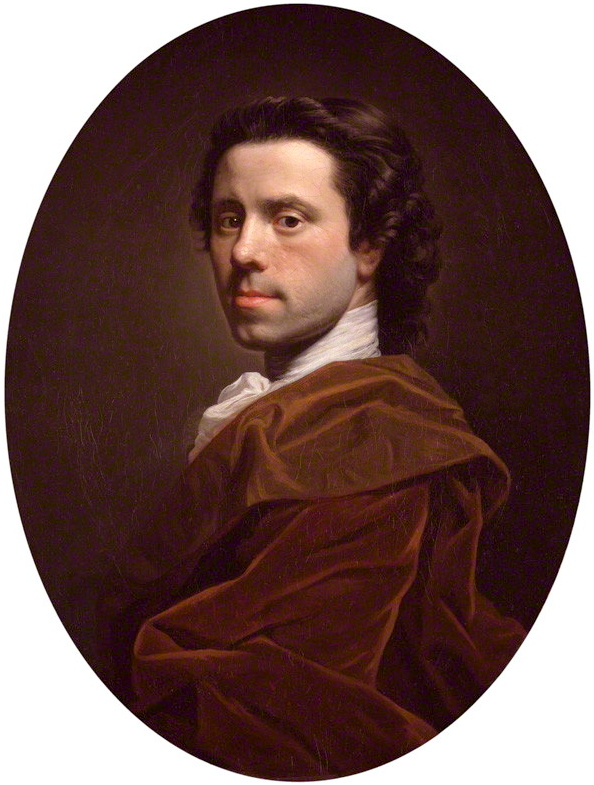
Self portrait by Allan Ramsay

The growing importance of royal art can be seen in the post of Painter and Limner, created in 1702 for George Ogilvie. The duties included drawing pictures of the Monarch's person, his successors and members of the royal family, for the decoration of royal houses and palaces. However, from 1723 to 1823 the office was a sinecure held by members of the Abercrombie family, not necessarily connected with artistic ability. Many painters of the early part of the eighteenth century remained largely artisans, like the members of the Norie family, James (1684–1757) and his sons, Robert and the younger James, who painted the houses of the peerage with Scottish landscapes that were capriccios or pastiches of Italian and Dutch landscapes. They tutored artists and have been credited with the inception of the tradition of Scottish landscape painting that would come to fruition from the late eighteenth century. Italy became an important point of reference for Scottish artists, with many taking the Grand Tour there to paint, sample the art and learn from Italian masters.

In 1729 there was an attempt to found a school of painting in Edinburgh as the Academy of St. Luke, named after the Renaissance Accademia di San Luca in Rome. Its president was George Marshall, a painter of still lives and portraits, and its treasurer was the engraver Richard Cooper. Other members included Cooper's student Robert Strange, the two younger Nories, the portrait painters John Alexander (c. 1690-c. 1733) and Allan Ramsay (1713–84). The success of the group was limited by its associations with Jacobitism, with Strange printing bank notes for the rebels. Alexander was a great grandson of George Jamesone. He studied in London and Rome, returning to Edinburgh about 1720 where he painted the Baroque The Rape of Proserpine, for the roof of a staircase at Gordon Castle and numerous portraits. Ramsay emerged as the most distinguished alumni of the academy. He studied in Sweden, London and Italy before basing himself in Edinburgh. There he established himself as a leading portrait painter to the Scottish nobility, before moving to London in 1757. He made occasional return visits to Edinburgh to undertake commissions for the nobility and gentry.
