= Patrick Hamilton of Kincavil =

Scottish nobleman

Sir Patrick Hamilton (died 1520) was a Scottish nobleman. He was an illegitimate son of James Hamilton, 1st Lord Hamilton, and a younger brother of James Hamilton, 1st Earl of Arran.

== Royal legitimation ==
In January 1513 James IV declared that because the 1st Earl of Arran then had no heirs, James Hamilton of Finnart the 1st Earl's son, with Patrick Hamilton of Kincavil and John Hamilton of Broomhill, the Earl's two half-brothers, would be considered legitimate and able to inherit Hamilton lands. Patrick bought a house in Linlithgow on the south side of High Street in February 1500, which his son James sold to James Hamilton of Finnart in 1531 when he bought the neighbouring house.

== Mining and fighting ==
In March 1516, the infant James V of Scotland and the Governor, Regent Albany leased Patrick to rights to mine for gold, silver, tin and other metals on Crawford Moor and other places. In 1520, as a result of rivalry between the Hamiltons and the 'Red' Douglases, he helped instigate the street brawl in Edinburgh known as 'Cleanse the Causeway'. The fight turned out badly for the Hamiltons, and Sir Patrick and about 70 others were killed. Cardinal Wolsey was told that Archibald Douglas, 6th Earl of Angus killed Patrick by his own hand.

== Family ==
His widow, Margaret Stewart, contracted a marriage with a John Hamilton, which was annulled on grounds of affinity in 1530–32.

His heir was his oldest son, Sir James Hamilton of Kincavil. A younger son, Patrick, become one of the first Lutherans in Scotland and a preacher. In 1528, he became a martyr of the Scottish Reformation.

A daughter was also a Protestant, and for a time wife of the captain of Dunbar Castle. She had been to London and had met Jane Seymour, and was living in Berwick-upon-Tweed in March 1539.
