= James, Duke of Rothesay =

James, Duke of Rothesay may refer to:

- James, Duke of Rothesay (1507–1508), the eldest son of James IV and his queen consort Margaret Tudor.
- James, Duke of Rothesay (1540–1541), the eldest son of James V and Mary of Guise, and nephew of his aforementioned namesake.
