= William Hill (blacksmith) =

Scottish blacksmith

William Hill was a Scottish blacksmith and fabricator of works in iron for James V of Scotland.

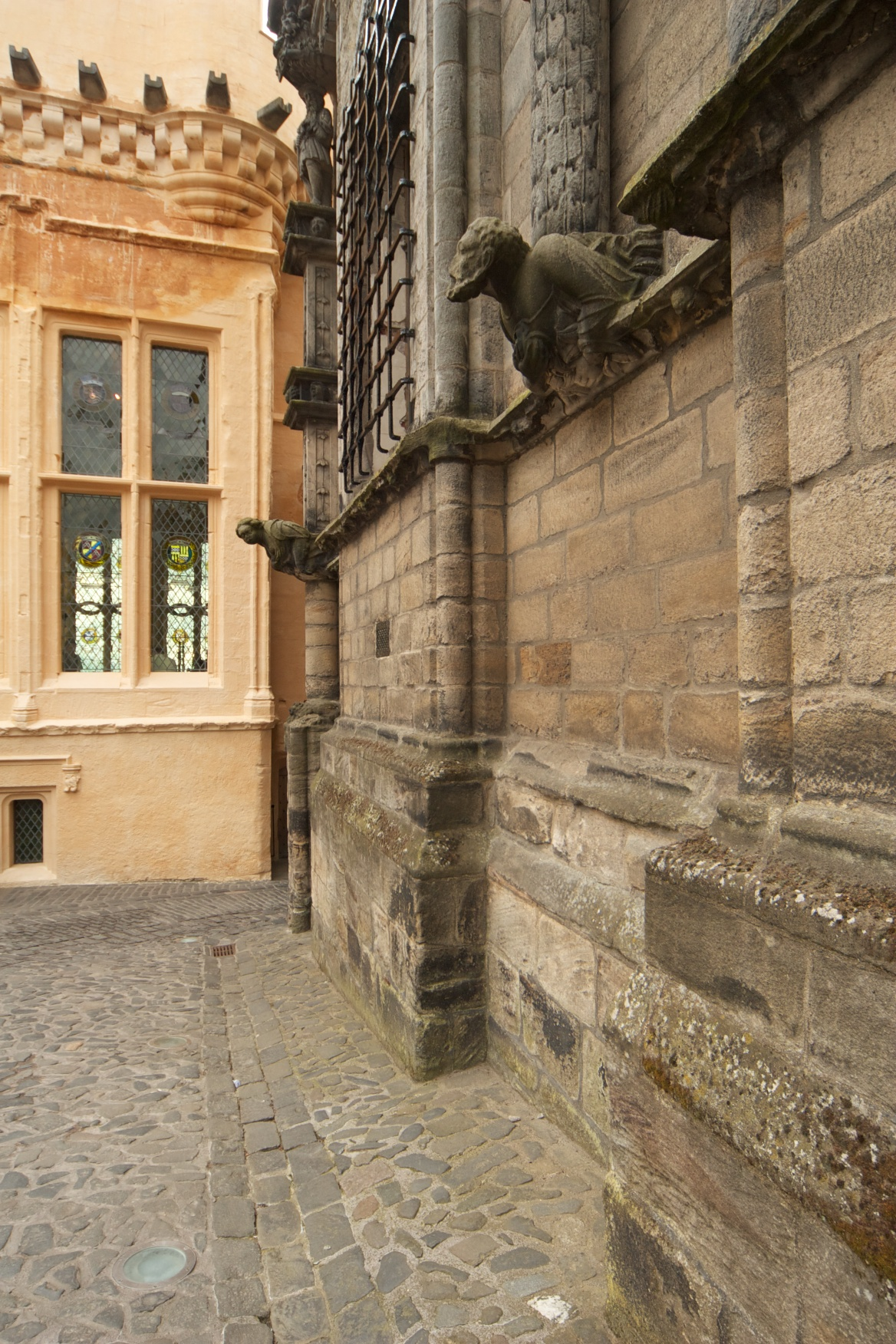
Yett or window grille at Stirling Palace made by William Hill and originally painted bright red

Hill had a forge in Edinburgh Castle. He made many iron gates and windows grills called yetts. Examples can be seen at Stirling Castle and Blackness Castle. In several other locations fixing holes in the masonry window surrounds can still be seen, especially around the central window of the ruined East Quarter of Falkland Palace, where Hill made a window for the bedchamber "where the king lies". The accounts mention that this yett had 6 upright standards and 14 horizontal "thortouris". These iron window grills were painted with red lead and finished with vermilion.

Hill made locks for doors and furniture, and draw bars for security, and hinges and bands for window shutters. He would often to ride to Falkland Palace to measure newly made windows in the palace and return to his forge in Edinburgh to make yetts and other items. Another smith who worked at Falkland, Alexander, made iron bars used to fix stone sculpture and doorways, and also maintained the tools used by the stonemasons. Alexander made horse shoes for the cart horses, and William Hill clad the cartwheels with iron shoes. Lumsden, a smith in Dysart, made fire grates.

Hill also worked with the royal artillery, occasionally helping to load guns on and off ships. He also supplied a variety of nails; some decorative nails for Holyrood Palace were described as great and smaller "schorn tynnit nails". He made bars and bolts to support and embellish decorative timber ceilings, "glass bands" to support the glazing of larger stained glass windows, which were installed by Thomas Peebles.

His official appointment as Master Smith was made on 8 May 1530.

In May 1538 William Hill rode to Tantallon Castle and Dunbar Castle with the master-carpenter John Drummond and the stonemason William Kadisley, to oversee repair works and make measurements for an iron gate.

A new forge was devised for William Hill and another smith John Spretty at Holyrood Palace in 1539. Hill made yetts for the new palace at Stirling Castle, at the request of James Hamilton of Finnart, and was paid in August 1541.

In 1543 he was employed by Regent Arran to increase the security of Linlithgow Palace by fitting iron window yetts, while the infant Mary, Queen of Scots and her mother Mary of Guise stayed there.

== William Hill in the royal accounts ==
Many payments to William Hill were recorded in the Scottish royal treasurer's accounts for work, wages, and clothes. The accounts are now preserved among the National Records of Scotland. The entries were written in the Scots language using some technical terms. This record describing his work on an iron yett with a wooden door made for Holyrood Palace was made for the last week of April 1530:

Item to William Hill for ix stane iii pund maid irne werk, for gret crukis, ane irne bar to the treyne dur wythout the irne yet, ii gret irne sloittis with ii keparis to the irne yet and treyne yet, to the closyng and stekyng of the samyn yettis, and ii irne barris that is ane bar now enterit, and the tother principall bar to the irne yet enterit in sommer last bipast and in thir comptis than price of the stane maid werk viii.s vi d. summa iii lib. xviii s.

(modernised) Item to William Hill for 9 stone 3 pound finished made iron work, for great crooks (to hang the doors), an iron bar to the wooden door outside the iron yett, 2 great iron bolts with 2 keepers to the iron yett and wooden yett, to the closing and fixing of the same yetts, and 2 iron bars that is one bar now entered (accounted for), and the other principal bar to the iron yett entered in Summer last bypast (accounted for last Summer) and in these accounts the price of the stone made iron work is 8 shillings and 6 pence, the sum is £3-18s Scots.
