= Stirling Heads =

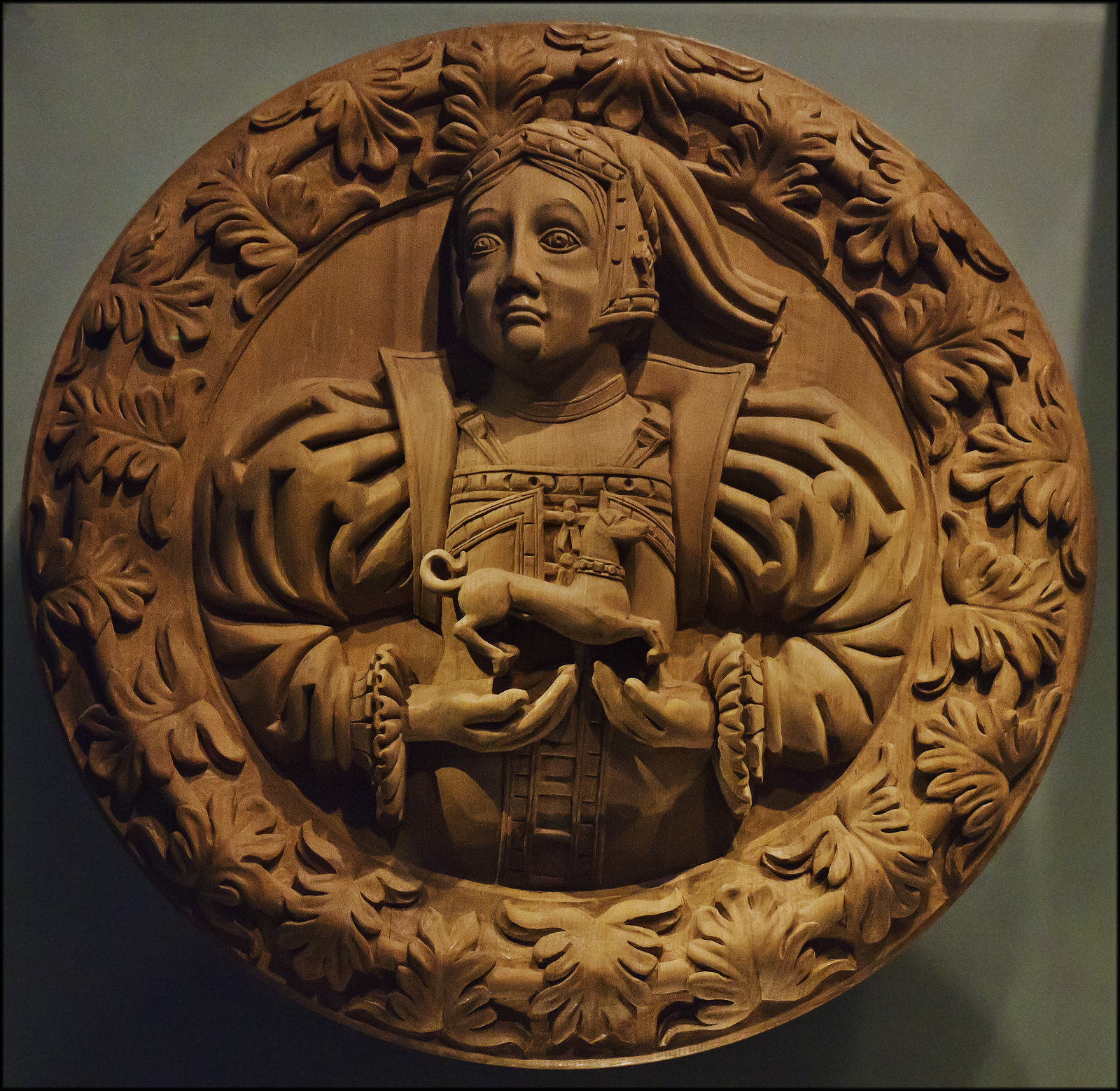
Stirling Head carving thought to depict Margaret Tudor, 1540

The Stirling Heads are a group of large oak portrait medallions made around the year 1540 to decorate the ceiling of a room at Stirling Castle. The style, in origin, was based on Italian architectural decoration and at Stirling was probably derived from a French source. Similar medallions carved in stone adorn Falkland Palace.

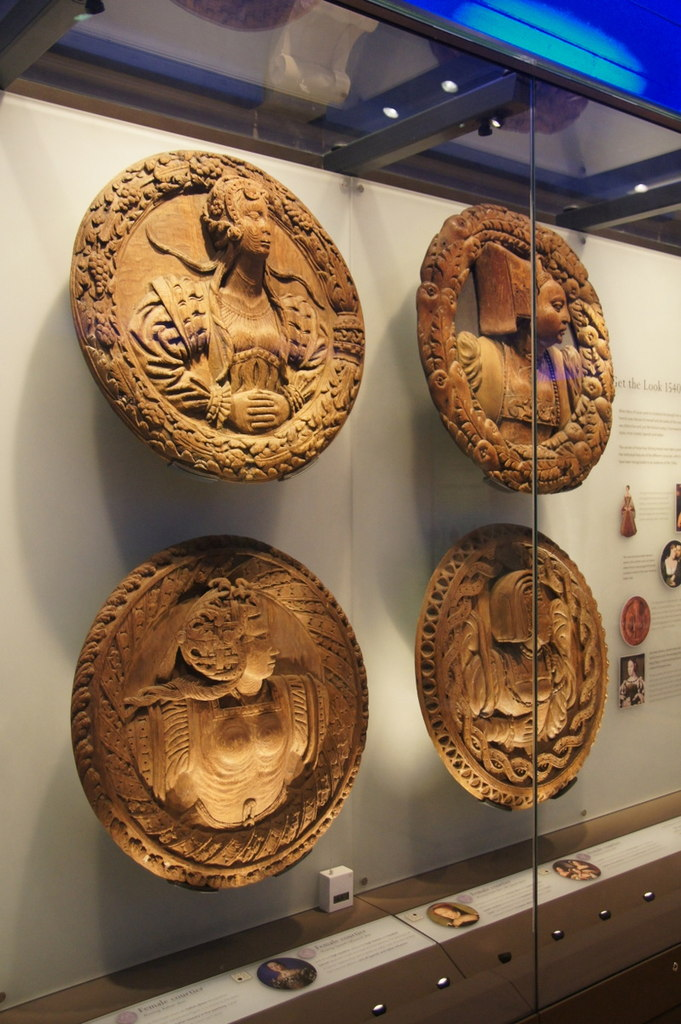
Original "Stirling Heads" displayed at Stirling Castle

== Background ==
James V of Scotland rebuilt the royal lodgings at Stirling Castle to form a new Palace, which included suites for the king and his consort Mary of Guise. The building works were supervised by James Hamilton of Finnart. There is very little documentation for the works. James V may have been inspired by a current belief that the Roman general Gnaeus Julius Agricola had rebuilt Stirling Castle "with diligence and sumptuous expense", and some of the medallion head carvings may have been intended to depict ancient heroes as supposed forebears of the Stewart dynasty.

The Stirling Heads represent James's ambitions for the interiors of his palaces, and seem based on French models which derive in turn from North Italian fashions. The carvings were traditionally attributed to a Scottish craftsman John Drummond of Milnab, and it is likely that a French colleague Andrew Mansioun was a significant contributor to the project. A carpenter and carver, Robert Robertson, was recorded working at Stirling Castle in this period, and was paid for work on the ceiling of the Queen's inner chamber at Falkland Palace.

The decorated coffer ceilings at Stirling were mentioned by a small number of travel writers including John Taylor, John Ray, John Macky, and John Loveday, before the King's inner chamber or inner hall ceiling was dismantled in 1777, and the heads were dispersed among antiquarian collectors. An illustrated book by Jane Graham, Lacunar Strevelinense, recorded the medallions and the names of various owners in 1817. This work indicates that the surviving heads came from the King's inner hall. The surviving timber structure (now concealed) of the adjacent King's bed chamber ceiling is unusual, indicating that its ceiling was also elaborately decorated.

The writer George Buchanan described the late 1530s as a period of relative stability in Scotland, and because James V was provided with heirs, he turned his attention to "useless buildings" and taxed the church and nobility to fund these projects. Robert Lindsay of Pitscottie, writing about the same years, praised James V for his patronage of expert craftsmen, especially foreign artisans.

== Portrait medallions ==
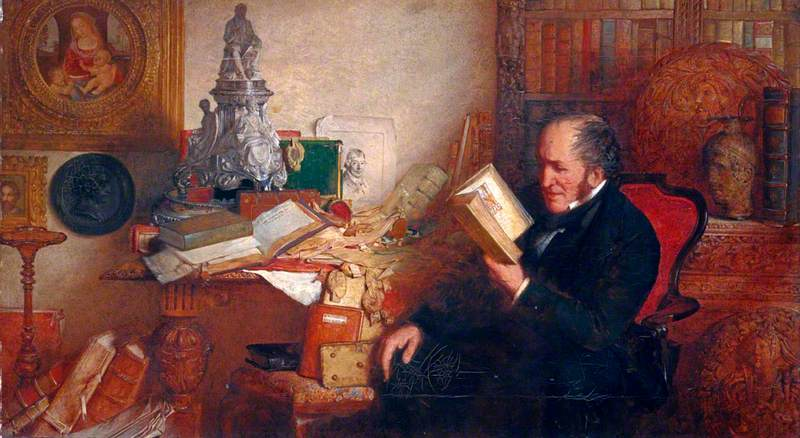
Portrait of the antiquary David Laing, by William Fettes Douglas, with the Stirling Heads thought to depict James V and Margaret Tudor

38 medallions now survive, and most are displayed in a dedicated museum on the upper floor of the Palace at Stirling above the Queen's outer chamber. The heads are around 74 cm in diameter. They were carved from planks of Baltic oak from a Polish source, glued together to make up the required depth.

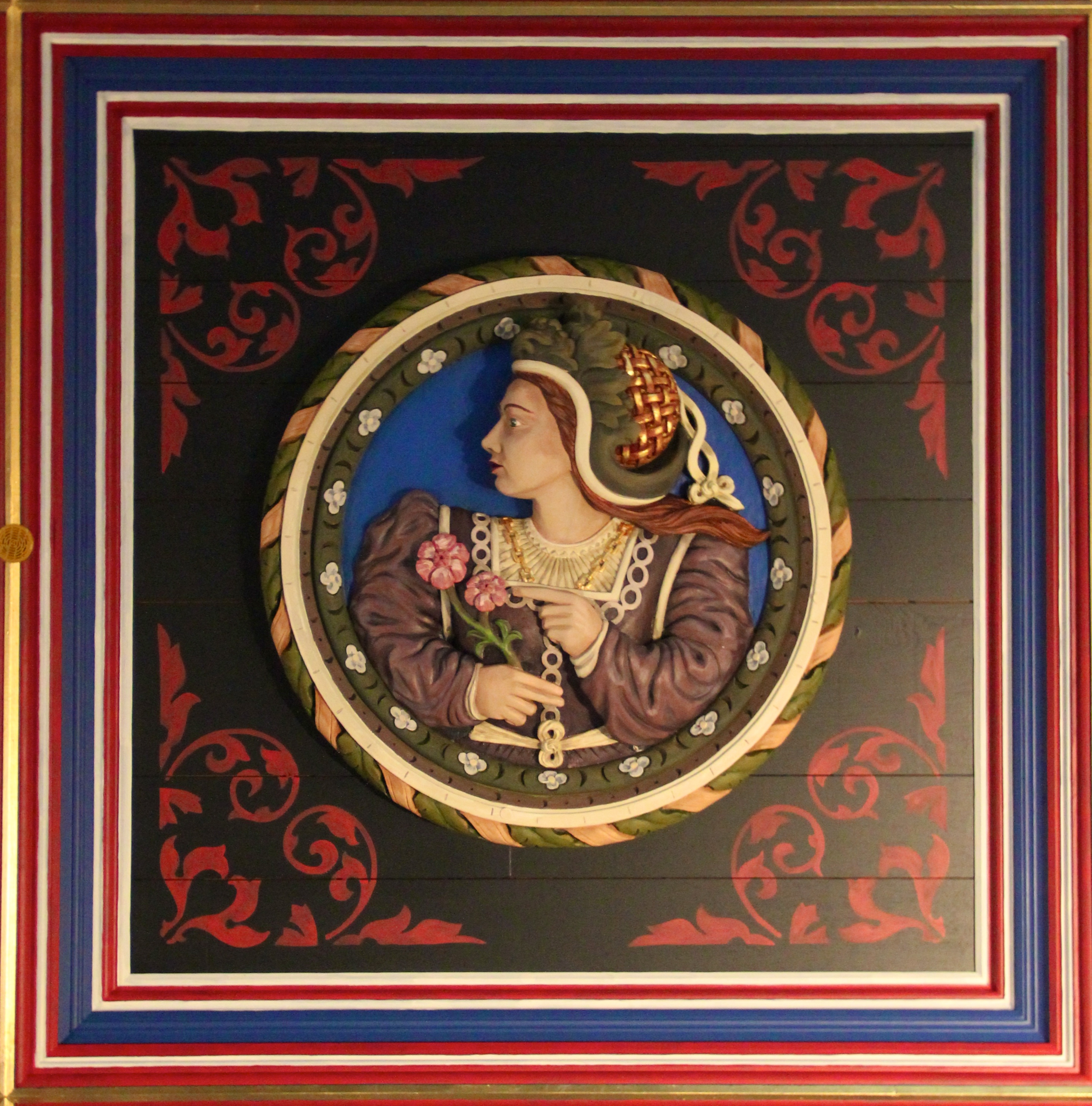
Recreation of a Stirling Head, said to depict Mary of Guise.

One carving (Head number 29) has an original design sketched on its back of a baluster flanked by two figures holding masks. Replica carvings were made for the 2010 restoration of the Palace, and these were painted based on examination of surviving traces of colour, and research into sixteenth-century practice. Originally, indigo was used to make a blue tint for the armour of the male figures, similar to the way armour is depicted with shades of blue in sixteenth-century tapestry. There was less direct evidence for other colours.

The subject matter is varied, and it is generally accepted that some of the medallions depict members of the Scottish royal family and Margaret Tudor, while others portray mythological characters including Hercules, and at least two carvings represent Roman emperors. One female portrait (number 40), the original destroyed in a fire in 1940, was recreated for the 2010 restoration and is said to depict Mary of Guise.

Interpretation of the surviving heads has developed and changed. In the 19th century, the medallion currently identified as Margaret Tudor, holding a greyhound emblem, then in the possession of David Laing, was thought to depict Mary of Guise.
