= Cleanse the Causeway =

Date	30 April 1520
Location	High Street, Edinburgh 55°57′0″N 3°11′18″W
Result	Douglas victory

Belligerents
Clan Douglas	Clan Hamilton

Commanders and leaders
Earl of Angus; Bishop of Dunkeld	Earl of Arran; Patrick of Kincavil †; James of Finnart

Strength
c. 500	c. 500

Casualties and losses
Unknown.	70–80

The skirmish known as Cleanse the Causeway, or Clear the Causeway, took place in the High Street of Edinburgh, Scotland, on 30 April 1520, between rival noblemen James Hamilton, 1st Earl of Arran, chief of Clan Hamilton, and Archibald Douglas, 6th Earl of Angus, chief of Clan Douglas.

== Background ==
The skirmish was the result of enmity between the House of Hamilton and the "Red" Angus line of the House of Douglas who were locked in a struggle for supremacy since the death of King James IV. James' death at the Battle of Flodden in 1513 had created a power vacuum in the Kingdom of Scotland. Both the Douglases and the Hamiltons were powerful noble families with royal connections. The Earl of Angus was married to Margaret Tudor - James IV's widow, sister to King Henry VIII of England and mother of the infant King James V - and the Earl of Arran was the cousin of the late King. Each side was jealous of the other's influence over the 8 year old James V.

Scotland at this time was under the regency of Angus' rival, John Stewart, Duke of Albany, but he had been detained in France since 1516. In his absence, a council of senior nobles and clergy were to share power; which included Arran and Angus. Albany (who was born in France to a French mother) also added a French ally to the council as a more neutral party, Antoine d'Arcy or De la Bastie. d'Arcy was murdered in September 1517 by members of the Home family with whom he had a feud and this implicated their allies the Douglases and by extension Angus. The murder of a French noble sparked a diplomatic incident and in response the council voted to place Arran as their leader who punished the offenders by seizing Home lands and castles, having a senior member of the family executed and imprisoning Angus' brother George Douglas of Pittendreich, Master of Angus on the island of Inchgarvie.

Angus had become estranged from his wife Margaret in 1516 but had managed to reconcile with her against Arran's wishes and took control over her, her Scottish estates and dowager income. Margaret in response attempted to use her influence with her brother King Henry VIII, the absent Regent Albany and her husband's rival Arran to improve her situation.

Arran, at the head of the Hamiltons, was determined to stop his rival Angus from gaining control over King James V and aimed to secure the regency for himself as the closest blood relative of the late James IV. In addition, Arran had been the Lord Provost of Edinburgh since 1517 but had alienated himself from the Edinburgh burgesses in 1519 over a disputed sale of a cargo of timber from a Dutch ship in Leith. At this time the Burgh of Edinburgh had customs and trading rights over the port of Leith however Arran had sided with the Leith merchants, supported by Robert Barton. Barton was a shipowner of considerable political influence and cited a privilege granted to him by James IV that allowed him to avoid abiding by import and export customs. By ignoring the rights of the Edinburgh burgesses, Arran lost their support and instead they supported the side of Angus during the skirmish.

== The Skirmish ==
Arran had entered Edinburgh at the head of his retinue of around 500 armed footmen and had based himself at the house of James Beaton, Archbishop of Glasgow at the foot of Blackfriars Wynd in the east of the city, intent on arresting Angus. However Angus was protected by a similar number of armed followers and had based himself at his town house on the West Bow at the other end of the High Street. Tensions were high between the rival factions as a Douglas follower, John Somerville, had recently attacked a party of Hamiltons on the highway and had killed 5 of them, seized 30 of their horses and forced the remainder to flee. A stand off ensued as each armed party attempted to gain ascendancy without wanting to be the one that instigated violence. On hearing of Arran's plan to arrest him, Angus sent his uncle Gavin Douglas, Bishop of Dunkeld, to mediate with his opponent and "to caution them against violence, and to inform them that if they had anything to allege against him he would be judged by the laws of the realm, and not by men who were his avowed enemies". The Bishop of Dunkeld found that Arran and his party were armed, armoured and intended to fight. Even the Archbishop of Glasgow was wearing a coat of chain mail under his ecclesiastical robes. Dunkeld therefore returned to Angus with the news and retired to the safety of his lodgings to pray.

In the meantime, Angus had drawn up his followers near the Netherbow Port at the head of Blackfriars Wynd, his ranks swelled by men of the city intent on revenge against Arran. The residents of the city who had gathered at their windows to watch the unfolding spectacle are reputed to have handed down weapons to those drawn to Angus' party who needed them. The heads of the closes (the narrow side streets of Edinburgh) had been barricaded to avoid him being attacked in his rear and to prevent his enemies from escaping. An alternative version of events states that it was Arran who had the barricades erected, to trap the Douglases in the city so they could be surprised, attacked individually and be unable to flee.

The Hamiltons commended the assault, led by Arran's half brother Patrick Hamilton of Kincavil who attempted to rush up Blackfriars Wynd at the Douglases but was quickly killed - reputedly by Angus. A bloody street battle ensued in which the Douglases took the upper hand and with a cry of "Cleanse the Causeway" forced the Hamiltons back down Blackfriars Wynd, with some 70 to 80 of their number being killed and the "wounded began to cumber the causeway in every direction". Towards the end of the action, 800 more Douglases arrived under the leadership of Angus' brother William Douglas, Prior of Coldingham.

Arran himself and his illegitimate son James Hamilton of Finnart managed to fight their way out of the mêlée and escape down one of the steep, narrow closes on the north of the High Street to the marshy edges of the Nor Loch. Here they found a collier's horse which they stole and both waded upon it across the shallows of the loch to the parkland beyond where they made their escape. At the end of the action, the Douglases were in control of Edinburgh and Angus sent trumpeters around the city offering quarter to any remaining Hamiltons on condition that they leave the city, which some 800 apparently did.

== Aftermath ==
Amongst the Hamilton dead was John, Master of Montgomery and son of Hugh Montgomerie, 1st Earl of Eglinton. The Archbishop of Glasgow fled to his church at Blackfriars where he was apprehended from behind the altar by the victorious Douglases, but was spared upon the intervention of Gavin Douglas, Bishop of Dunkeld and allowed to flee on foot to Linlithgow, 16 miles distant. In revenge for their loss the Hamiltons besieged Dean Castle in Kilmarnock which was held by a Douglas ally, Robert Boyd, but were unable to capture it.

A tit-for-tat struggle continued between the Douglases and Hamiltons until Regent Albany returned from France the following year and retook control of Scotland and its young king. Albany quickly put Angus on charges of High Treason and had him exiled to France. Arran was returned to the regency council in 1522 under Albany, and in 1524 he and Margaret were able to oust Albany and have the 12 year old James proclaimed as adult ruler. In 1525, Angus returned with the backing of Henry VIII of England and was able to forcefully have himself readmitted to the council of regency, take control of King James, and hold him virtual prisoner and rule on his behalf. The power struggles that followed would result in an unlikely alliance between Angus and Arran, and it was the latter who would lead the victorious pro-Angus forces at the Battle of Linlithgow Bridge in 1526 against the pro-Margaret force under John Stewart, 3rd Earl of Lennox.
