= John Drummond of Milnab =

Scottish carpenter

John Drummond of Milnab (d. c.1550) was a 16th-century Scottish carpenter in charge of the woodwork of the palaces, castles and guns of James IV of Scotland and James V of Scotland.

John Drummond was the second son of James Drummond of Auchterader. A family history narrates that in 1521, John Drummond was given the lands and mill of Milnab in Strathearn, and the royal charter described him in Latin as; "Machinarum bellicarum ejaculator et carpentarius noster," - "keeper of the throwing machines of war and our carpenter." The gift was from the young king with the advice of his mother Margaret Tudor.

== Royal buildings ==
A Drummond family history attributed to him the fine timber work at Stirling Castle including the ceiling medallions known as the "Stirling Heads" and the roof of Drummond Castle set up in 1493.

Records of the royal exchequer of Scotland outline the career of the Master Wright with more certainty. John Drummond was first recorded as a wright (carpenter) in 1506. In December 1508 James IV gave him a pension of £10 from the customs of Edinburgh, which he later surrendered for the gift of the mill of Milnab. James V made him Principal Master Wright on 8 June 1532. In Spring 1538 he went to Tantallon Castle and Dunbar Castle with William Hill, the master-smith, to oversee repair works.

John Drummond and his two workmen went to France in 1538 on the ships that brought the king's bride Mary of Guise to Scotland. In 1541 he built a part of the Register House in Edinburgh Castle and also worked at the castle of Crawfordjohn which had been forfeited to the crown by James Hamilton of Finnart.

In March 1540 he organised repairs and re-slating of the roof of the great hall of Edinburgh Castle. In December 1541 he made an organ-loft at Edinburgh Castle and it was carried in carts down to Holyroodhouse to be installed for Christmas.

== Moving and mounting the royal artillery ==
In 1515, John took the guns off two warships, the James and Margaret, at Dumbarton, which had been returned from France by the Duke of Albany, and took the cannon to Edinburgh overland via Glasgow. John was often based at Edinburgh Castle where carpenters and ironworkers maintained the royal artillery. He directed the transport of these heavy guns. In 1528 he and another gunner, Robert Borthwick, advised the Master of Artillery, Alexander Jardine of Applegarth on cannon and equipment required to besiege Tantallon Castle. Timber from Lochaber was shipped to Edinburgh to mount the royal cannons in 1532. A servant of John Drummond spent 10 days supervising labourers.

Drummond also had an armoury in a building at the gate of Holyroodhouse rented from the priest of St. Leonards. On 8 August 1536, John delivered guns to George Stirling of Glorat at Dumbarton Castle. These included four great guns furnished with stocks, wheels, vices and wedges, six falcons with stocks and wheels, 33 hagbutts, four iron culverins, bullets, gunpowder and ramrods. John took away a 10 foot long brass gun barrel.

Drummond went with the King to France in 1536. A friend of the exiled Douglas family, John Penven, wrote to George Douglas of Pittendreich describing how he went to Newhaven by Dieppe to speak secretly to 'John of Drummond.' Drummond was charged with keeping the King's treasure ship and would not speak with Penven. However, John Barton, the mariner, told Penven that the King had spoken to Drummond during the voyage, telling him how he played James Hamilton of Finnart against the Earl of Angus. After James and his French bride, Madeleine of Valois, arrived at Leith in June 1537, Drummond and two helpers spent six weeks taking the guns from the ships off their sea-stocks and mounting them on land-stocks.

Drummond sailed to France to collect Mary of Guise, the King's second bride. His work continued at Edinburgh Castle, making and mounting new guns. In March 1539, the English messenger Henry Ray was told by a "secret friend" who was an associate of the banished Earl of Angus and an officer of the Scottish royal ordnance that 16 great cannons or culverins and 60 smaller guns had been refurnished or newly made in Edinburgh Castle. All the guns would be ready 20 days after Easter.

After working at Crawfordjohn and cladding the new Register House at Edinburgh Castle with imported 'Eastland' oak boards in July 1541, in August he went to the woods of Calder for twenty days and cut down 'ane hundredth grete treis' to make wheels for the artillery carts. For this he paid the forester a duty of fourpence a tree and then the timber was carted to Edinburgh. In March 1542, when a cannon had been successfully cast at Edinburgh Castle, Drummond paid the wood-carver Andrew Mansioun to engrave the royal arms and date on the barrel. In the same month the Mary Willoughby delivered three cannons bought from Hans Anderson in Flanders. Drummond directed the workmen who unloaded the double-cannon and two great culverin-moyanes at Leith and laid them on the Shore. After an extra difficulty when the draught horses refused at the gate of Edinburgh castle, the guns were mounted using a crane. John Drummond was also in charge of the manufacture of gunpowder at Edinburgh.

At the start of the war with England called the Rough Wooing, John Drummond was at the siege of Glasgow Castle in April 1544, and was with the gunners who defended Edinburgh Castle from Lord Hertford's army in May 1544. In September 1545, Drummond was summoned from his home to help carry the artillery towards the English border. In September 1547 he was working at Dunbar Castle, and led the artillery train from Edinburgh Castle to the Battle of Pinkie Cleugh. John was given livery clothes at Christmas, the last time in 1550, and thereafter there is no further record.

== Family and homes ==
According to the family history of 1681, his mother was a daughter of the Laird of Craigie-Ross. John married a daughter of the Laird of Logie-Bisset, and they had a daughter who married Sir Robert Logan of Restalrig. John's brother, David Drummond, succeeded him at Milnab. A royal charter of 7 May 1527 sets out that his daughter Jonet and her heirs would inherit Milnab. A charter of 19 July 1536 gave lands near Haddington with Milnab to him and his wife, Christiane Brogy, without mentioning Jonet. A subsequent charter of 20 April 1541, apportions the lands to all three. The latest charter also seems to be the one mentioning 'bellicarum ejaculator' quoted but wrongly dated by the family historian . It would seem that from this sequence that Christiane Brogy was John's second wife, but there is no record of Jonet's marriage. The lands near Haddington at Ballencreiff neighboured those granted to other royal servants, Robert Borthwick, gun founder to James IV, and Robert Gibb of Carriber, a master of the stable of James V.
