= Yett =

Form of gate in medieval structures

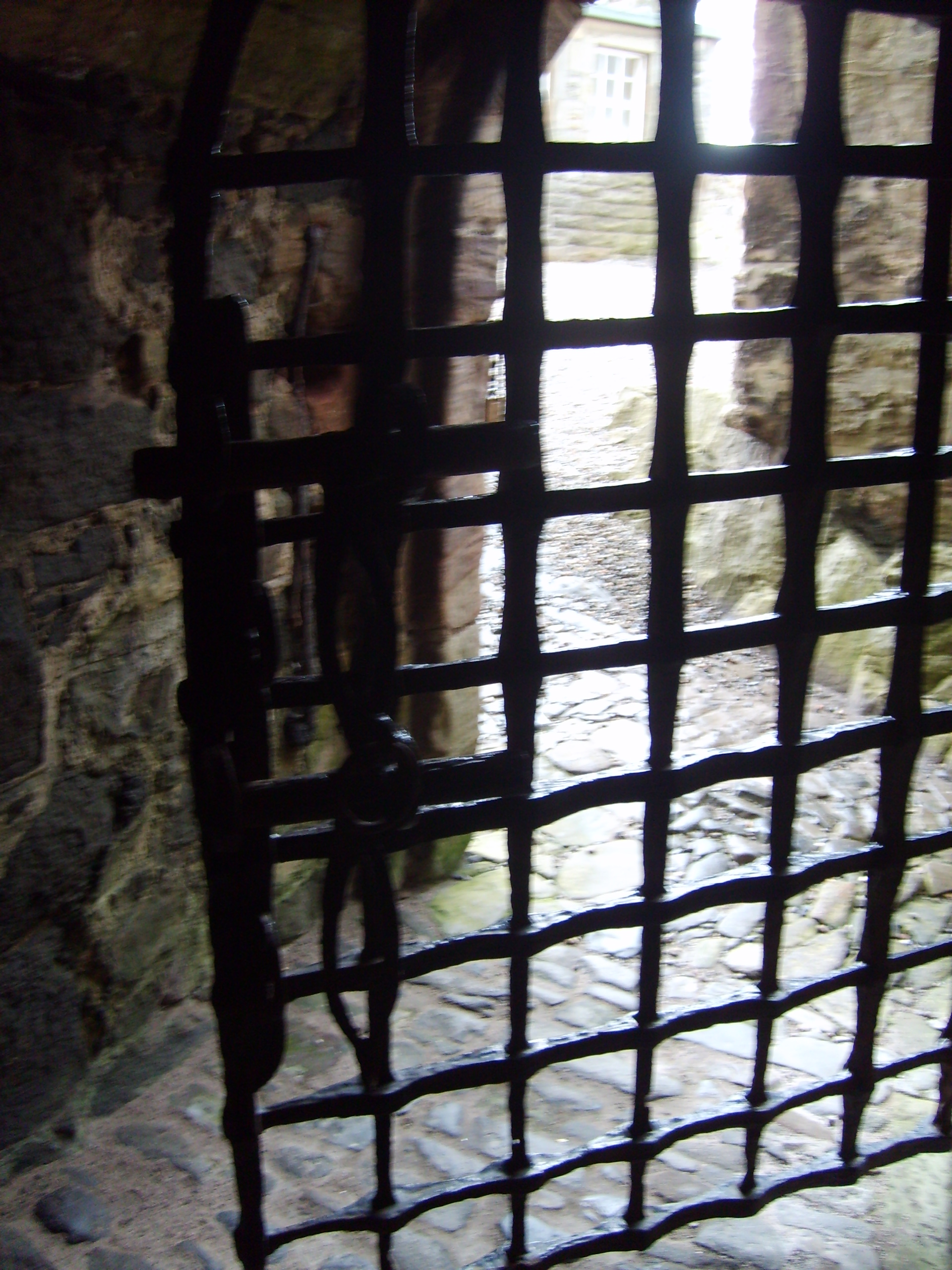
Yett hanging in the main entrance of Blackness Castle, Scotland, showing attached bolts and pierced construction. Wrought in 1693.

A yett (from the Old English and Scots language word for "gate") is a gate or grille of latticed wrought iron bars used for defensive purposes in castles and tower houses. Unlike a portcullis, which is raised and lowered vertically using mechanical means, yetts are hinged in the manner of a traditional gate or door and are secured either by bolts attached to the yett or by long bars drawn out from the wall or gateway.

== Geographical distribution ==
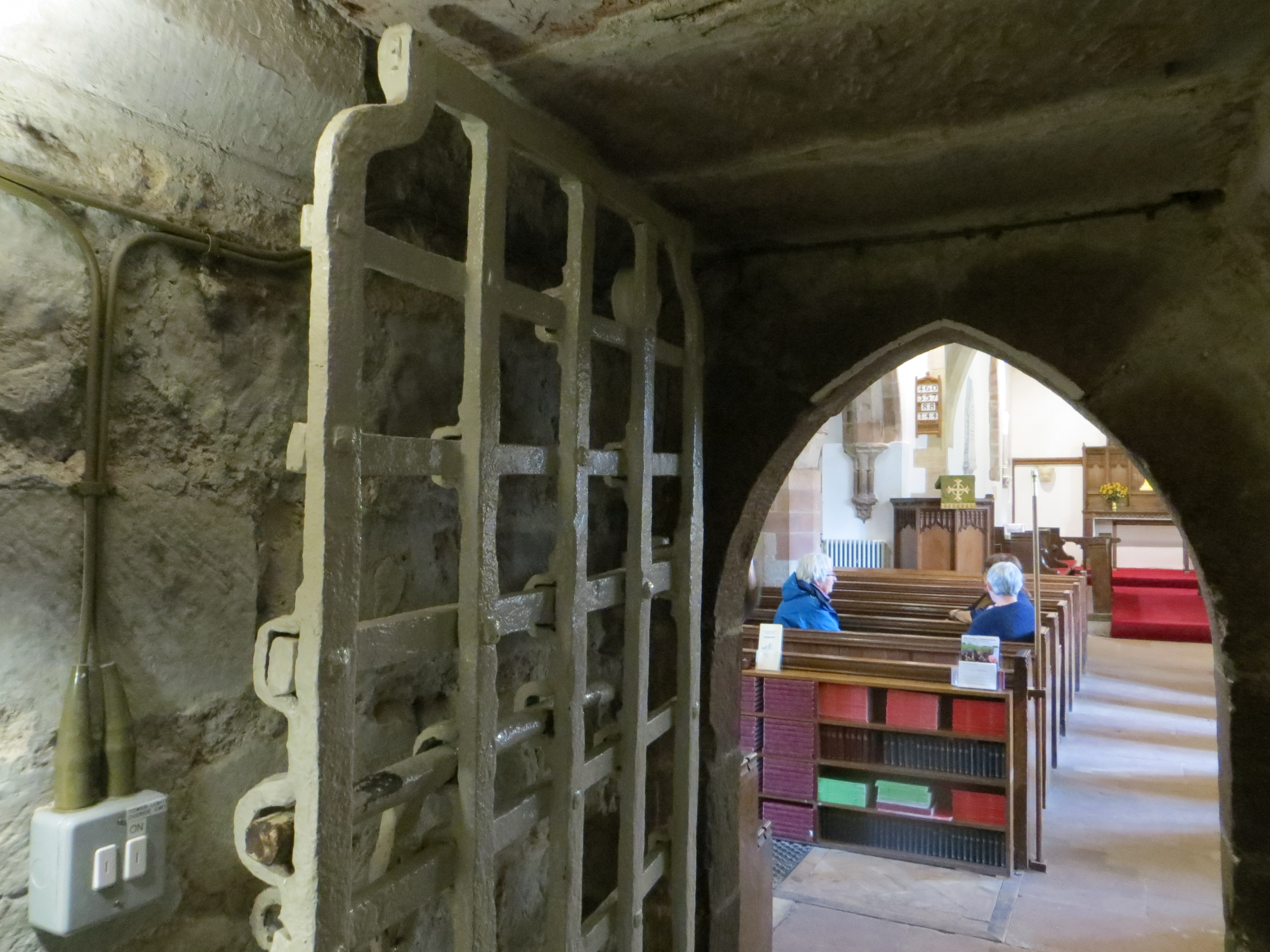
Yett at St Michael's Church, Burgh by Sands, Cumbria

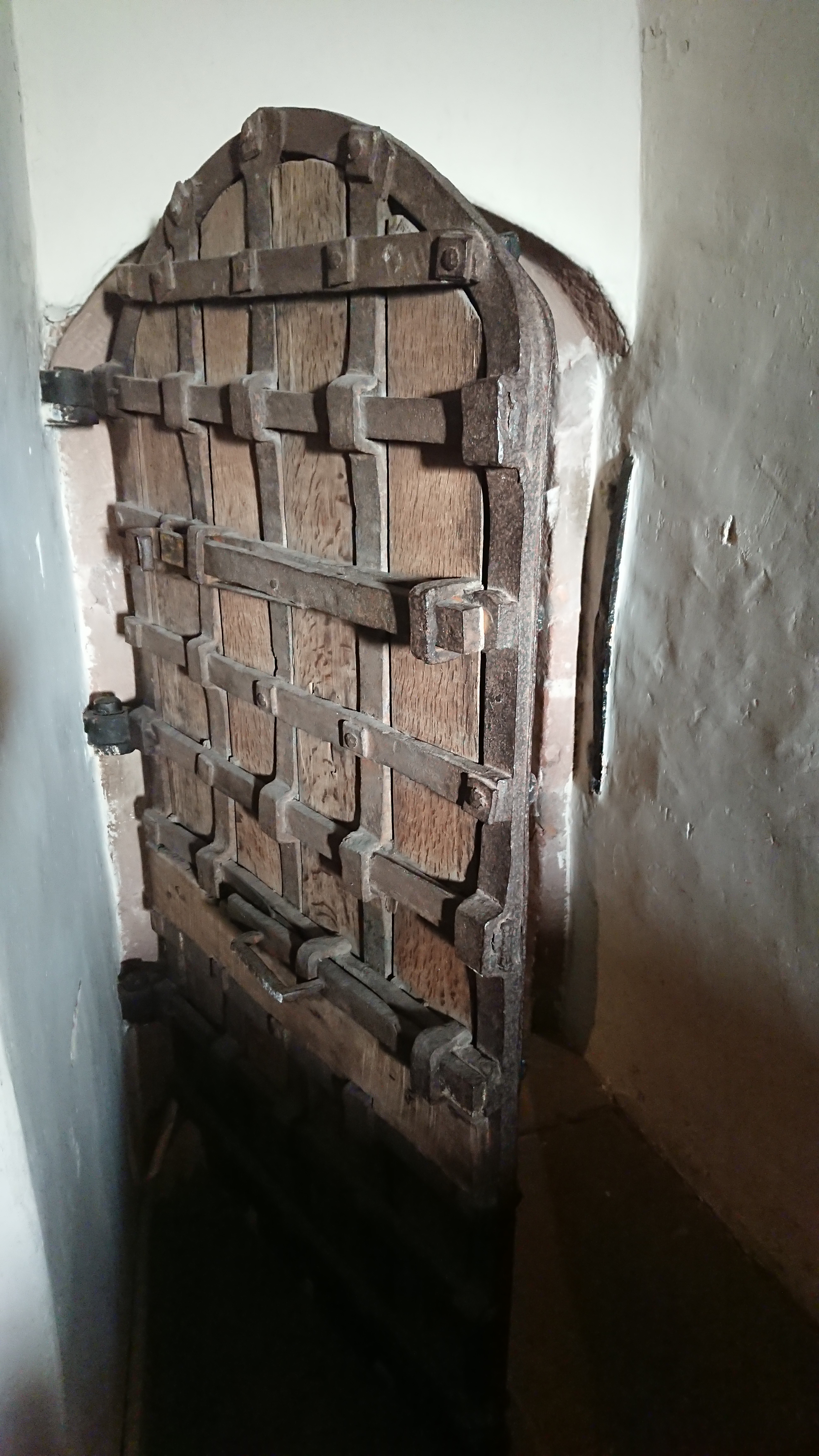
Yett between the tower and the church at St Cuthbert's Church, Great Salkeld, Cumbria, viewed from inside the tower.

Yetts are predominantly found in Scotland – where most towers, particularly the later ones, were equipped with them rather than portcullises – but some iron gates are found in the Border counties of England. While few references to yetts exist outside Scotland, an English report of 1416 on Roxburgh Castle (then in English hands) contains recommendations for the insertion of iron gates. Yetts are not restricted to any one region or district within Scotland but are widespread throughout.

Similar grille constructions, frequently also referred to as yetts, were used in Scotland over windows and other openings. These were typically fixed in place, often set into the jambs, sills, and lintels.

== Origins and use ==
The earliest references to yetts date from the 14th century. Exchequer Rolls from 1377 refer to a "fabricated iron gate", part of the defences for David's Tower in Edinburgh Castle. Yetts were also appearing in other castles at about the same time. Craigmillar, built soon after 1374, reputedly contained a yett, and Doune Castle (c. 1380) still retains its original double-leafed yett; a similar double-leafed yett is present at Balvenie, but its age is uncertain. By the 15th century, yetts and window-grilles had become standard features within Scottish castles and towers.

The yett was frequently used as a cheaper alternative to the portcullis, since it was simpler in concept, less cumbersome and more practical. However, it was also used within more complex defensive arrangements. The 14th-century castle at Doune, in Perthshire, had a portcullis in the main gateway supplemented by a yett, with a second yett at the far bailey end of the passage. The yetts each had two leaves, with a wicket gate inserted within one of the leaves. Commonly, the yett would be placed behind a wooden door, providing additional security should the outer door be burned.

Because the yett was a defensive structure, royal warrants were required before any could be added to a house or castle. These warrants were frequently issued along with other licences for defensive features; for example, in 1501 John Murray of Cockpool was given a licence to build a tower at Comlongon with machicolations and "irneztteis and windois". Aggressors might attempt to remove yetts: in February 1489 the Hepburns in Stirlingshire brought an action against the Grahams who had taken away the iron yett of Bruce's Tower in order to gain possession. In August 1548, during the war of the Rough Wooing, Regent Arran slighted Hailes Castle so the English could not use it by removing the iron gates or yetts.

After an attack on the principal yett of the House of Kinblethmont near Arbroath in November 1602 against Alexander Lindsay, 1st Lord Spynie, by the Ogilvies, in December 1602 James VI of Scotland recognised the threat posed to security by the increasing use of explosive petards, which meant that no longer could anyone "assure his own safety and preservation within his own houses and iron yetts". Following the Union of the Crowns in 1603, efforts were made by the government to control the disorder and reiving in the borders. In November 1606 it was recognised that one of the impediments to the administration of justice in the area was the strength of the houses. Consequently, the Privy Council ordered that all yetts should be removed from all houses belonging to those lower in rank than barons.

== Construction ==
In Scotland, yetts were traditionally made using a "through and through" construction, with both horizontal and vertical bars woven alternatively either around or through each other, creating a structure almost impossible to dismantle. The grille was left open. The usual method was to build the yett in quadrants with all the bars in a quadrant passing either vertically or horizontally through the mating bars. This method of construction for gates is not seen outside Scotland, although window grilles constructed in this manner are found in northern Italy and Tyrol.

Grated windows in the Scottish style were traditional in Tyrol in the 15th century, and similar window grilles are seen a century later in Venice, particularly at the Palazzo Ducale (although the bars are somewhat larger than those used in Scotland). It is likely the craft spread south from Tyrol to the Venetian Republic, but there appears to be little connection to the earlier Scottish technology (although there was some trade between Scotland and Germany).

Grated iron doors were found in England, but were constructed using a different method. For the English-style gate, the vertical bars all passed in front of the horizontal bars, and were riveted or fixed in place; the spaces were infilled with oak, making the gate solid. One notable exception, however, was constructed using the Scottish method: a yett from Streatlam Castle, now held at the Bowes Museum in nearby Barnard Castle. Streatlam was rebuilt by Sir George Bowes following damage in the 16th century; the Bowes family had connections in Scotland, which may have inspired the yett construction.

Since yetts were immensely heavy, and there is little evidence to suggest they were prefabricated, it is possible that many were made locally rather than transported large distances, either by local smiths or itinerant specialists. A blacksmith in Elgin called George Robertson made a new iron yett for the great tower at Kilravock in February 1568. Many of the yetts and window grilles of Scottish royal palaces were made to measure in the smithy of the royal artillery by William Hill at Edinburgh Castle and transported to houses like Falkland Palace, Hamilton Palace, and Linlithgow Palace, and some for Stirling Castle were made in Linlithgow. Conventionally, window-grilles were built into the stone window-frames.

== Costs ==
Some price data for the comparative cost of yetts survive in old accounts. In 1515, the smith Robert Scott and his brother were paid £8-8s for working yetts in Hume Castle. The iron itself cost £17-6s with £1 worth of coal. Records show that a yett constructed in 1568 for Kilravock Castle by a local smith weighed 34 stone 3 pounds (217 kg; 479 lb), and cost £34-3s-9d along with "three bolls meal, ane stane butter, and ane stane cheese."
