= James, Duke of Rothesay (1540–1541) =

Heir apparent to James V

James
- Duke of Rothesay
- Born: 22 May 1540; St Andrews, Fife, Scotland
- Died: 21 April 1541 (aged 10 months 30 days); St Andrews, Fife, Scotland
- Burial: Holyrood Abbey, Edinburgh
- House: House of Stewart
- Father: James V
- Mother: Mary of Guise

James, Duke of Rothesay (22 May 1540 – 21 April 1541) was the first of the two sons and three children born to King James V of Scotland and his second wife, Mary of Guise. From the moment of his birth James was Duke of Rothesay and heir apparent to the Scottish throne.

== Life ==
In January 1540, Mary of Guise, was known to be pregnant. She was crowned as consort queen of Scotland in February. James, Duke of Rothesay was born in St Andrews on 22 May 1540. As James V's first legitimate child and the heir to the throne, he automatically became Duke of Rothesay, Earl of Carrick, Baron of Renfrew, Lord of the Isles and Prince and Great Steward of Scotland. James V sent messengers to inform Henry VIII of England and Francis I of France of the birth.

The King travelled from Edinburgh to St Andrews, and the day was recorded by his pursemaster as "nato principe", the birth of the prince. In Edinburgh, the craft fraternities celebrated with a procession on the High Street. An English border official, Brian Layton, saw bonfires in Scottish villages to celebrate the birth on the night of Trinity Sunday.

The baby prince was baptised in a lavish ceremony in St Andrews on 26 May. His godparents were the Queen Dowager Margaret Tudor (his paternal grandmother), Cardinal David Beaton, Archbishop of St Andrews, and Gavin Dunbar, Archbishop of Glasgow. Fifteen ells of white Genoese taffeta were used as serviettes to hold the torches at the baptism, the child was provided with a cradle carved by a French craftsman Andrew Mansioun, and a canopy for his bed of state, members of the nobility were summoned to attend, and coats of arms were painted by Thomas Craigy.

Some of the king's silver plate and items newly made for the prince by John Mosman were sent from Edinburgh to St Andrews by boat for the occasion. Some descriptions of Scottish royal baptisms mention the use of a silver laver or jug and a basin.

The baptism may have been celebrated with a fireworks display, the royal accounts for June 1540 reveal two French royal gunners were paid for making fyre werk schot devisit be the Kingis grace. The ingredients for the fire-balls and other fireworks included mercury, aqua vitae, walnut oil, brimstone, lint, hemp, and tallow.

The king's former favourite James Hamilton of Finnart was executed in August 1540. His silver, for use in his chapel, was brought from Craignethan Castle to Edinburgh, where John Mosman engraved it with the heraldry of James, Duke of Rothesay. The re-purposed silverware was sent to Thomas Duddingston, master of the prince's household at St Andrews.

A list of payments for livery clothes to his household servants made in January 1541 includes two servants of his half-sister Lady Jean Stewart. The prince had four ladies to rock his cradle and his own master cook. Jean Sinclair was his nurse.

James, Duke of Rothesay died at St Andrews on 21 April 1541, before he had reached his first birthday. He was buried in Holyrood Abbey. His younger brother, Robert, Duke of Albany, died the day before at just 9 days old.

Margaret Tudor, his grandmother, wrote to her brother Henry VIII on 12 May from Stirling Castle about the death of the two sons and the grief of the parents. She said she took great diligence to put them in comfort, and was "never from them, but ever in their company".

Henry Ray, Berwick Pursuivant, an English messenger, saw James V at Stirling Castle and reported he "was very pensive and sorrowful for the death of his two children, dying suddenly, both within 14 hours". Scottish chronicle writers including John Knox and George Buchanan mention a story that James V had a dream at Linlithgow Palace which foretold the death of his sons. In the dream, James Hamilton of Finnart came to him and threatened to cut his arms off.

== Sources ==
- Scott, A.G. (1833). A Diurnal of Remarkable Occurrents That Have Passed Within the Country of Scotland Since the Death of King James the Fourth Till the Year M.D.Lxxv. Edinburgh, Scotland.
- Thomas, Andrea (2005). Princelie Majestie: The Court of James V of Scotland, 1528–1542. Edinburgh, Scotland: Tuckwell Press Ltd.

Peerage of Scotland
Vacant Title last held by James (V)	Duke of Rothesay; 1540-1541	Vacant Title next held by James (VI)
