= Andrew Mansioun =

French artist (??–1579)

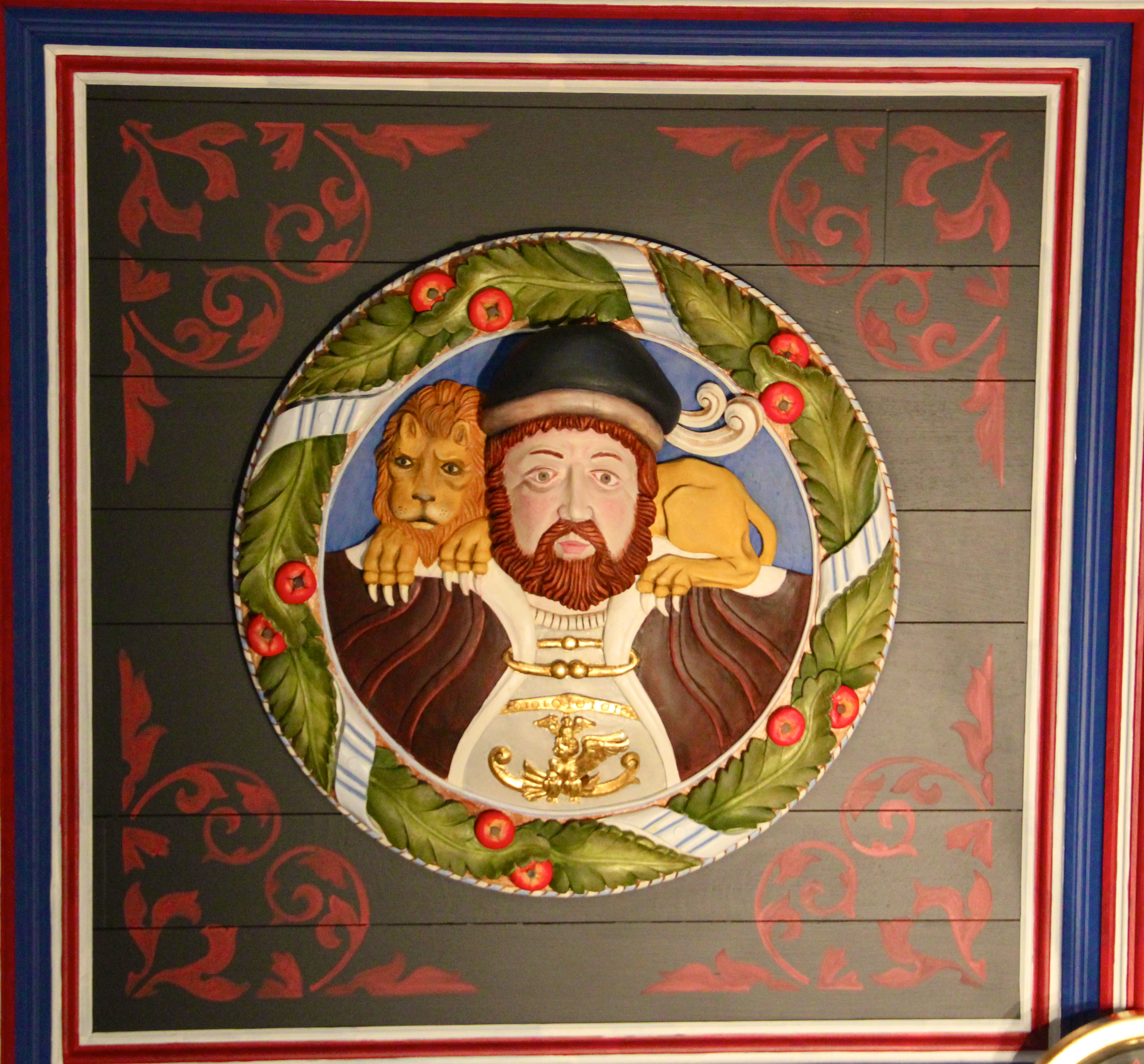
One of the 'Stirling Head' medallions of 1540, possibly by Andrew Mansioun, recreated for Stirling Palace in 2009 by John Donaldson

Andrew Mansioun, or Mentioun or Manschone or Manson, (d. 1579) was a French artist who worked at the court of James V, King of Scots. He was the master carpenter of the Scottish artillery for Mary, Queen of Scots and James VI of Scotland.

== Works ==
Andrew is recorded carving decorative wood-work, engraving metal, making moulds for cast-iron decorations, and gun-founding. He may have worked on the surviving 34 "Stirling Heads", oak medallion portraits made c.1540 at Stirling Castle with John Drummond of Milnab and other furnishings. His projects included; the fittings of the royal suite on the yacht Unicorn; an engraved brass for the tomb of David Beaton's parents at Markinch in 1541; and a carved lion and a Latin inscription for the tomb of James V in 1542. He made a cradle for Prince James, the short-lived son of James V and Mary of Guise, and a bed for Regent Arran. Andrew made moulds for use in the gun-foundry at Edinburgh Castle, for placing the royal arms and ciphers on cannon barrels, and also engraved ciphers and dates on the guns. He was appointed a gunner in the Scottish artillery on 3 August 1543 with a monthly salary of £3.

On the basis of the commission for Cardinal Beaton at Markinch, the historian David McRoberts raised the possibility that Mansioun was responsible for the carved oak "Beaton panels" now in the National Museum of Scotland, which carry the Cardinal's heraldry.

=== Stirling Heads ===
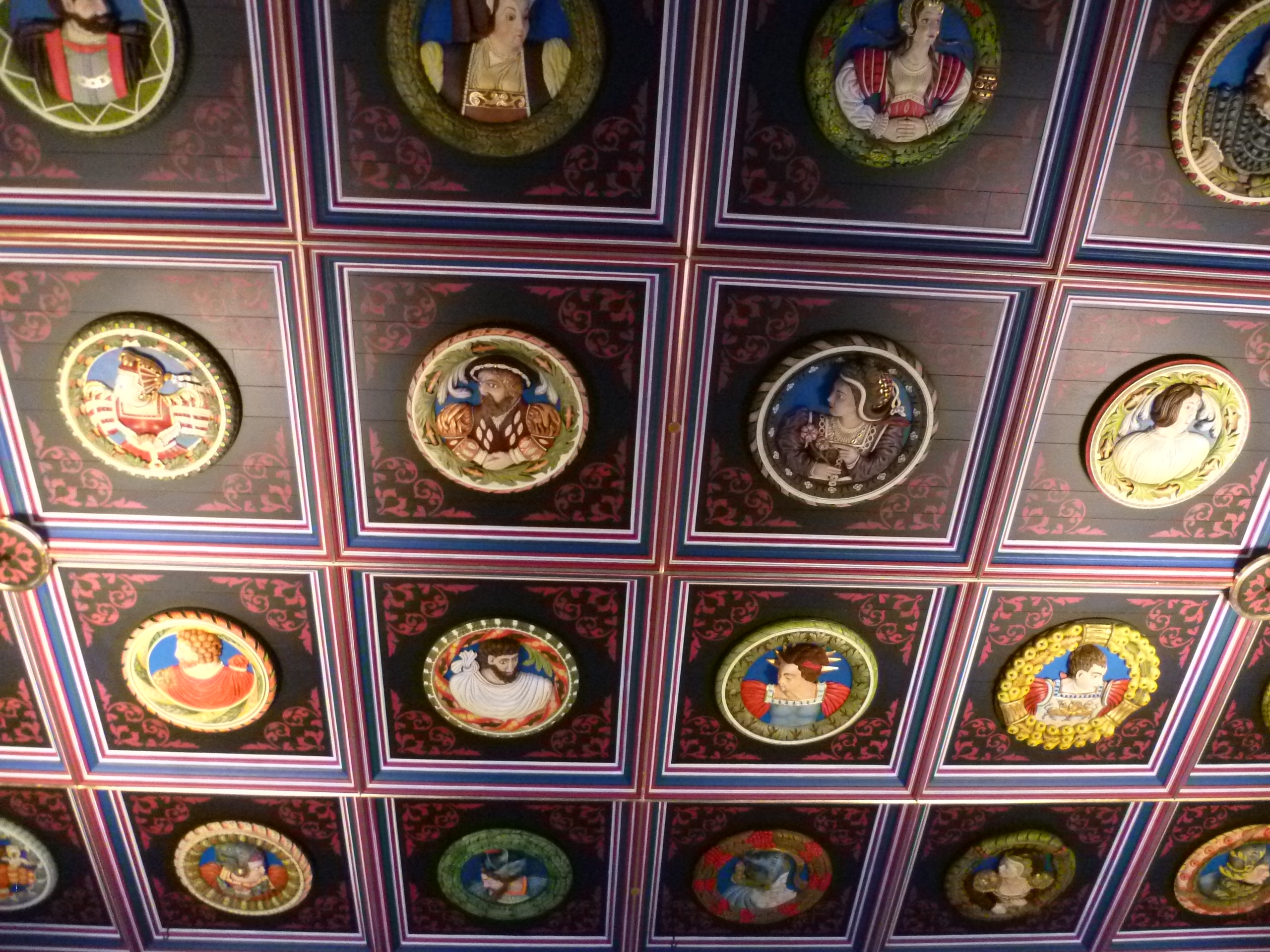
The restored ceiling at Stirling Castle

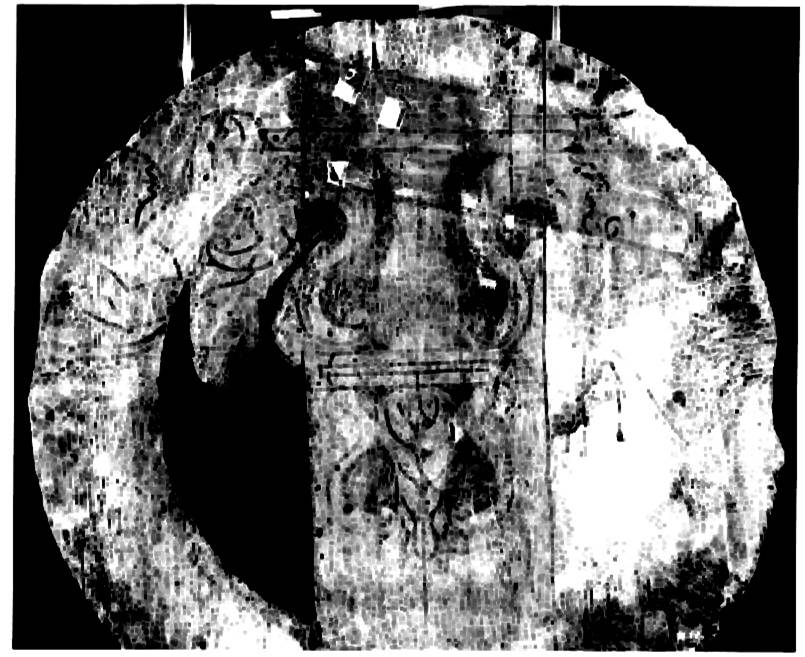
Drawing discovered on the reverse of Stirling Head no. 29

The Stirling Heads, the portrait roundels made for the ceiling of the King's Presence chamber at Stirling Castle in 1540, were carved from oak grown in forests in Poland. They were originally painted, and traces of blue-grey paint made with indigo which depicted the steel armour of some figures were identified by conservators. Some similar carvings, in stone, can be seen on the facades of Falkland Palace. The stone medallions at Falkland may have been the work of Nicolas Roy. The subjects depicted may relate to the ancestry of the Stewart kings, classical mythology, and Bible stories. For the restoration of the palace at Stirling in 2010, a new set of medallions was carved by John Donaldson, and they were painted by a team led by John Nevin and Graciela Ainsworth.

During the examination and conservation of the Stirling Heads a drawing made by one of the original carvers was discovered by a conservator-restorer on the reverse of one medallion (a woman in masque costume (STC029), depicting a baluster flanked by mermaids holdings masks, a typical renaissance design. This drawing may have been the work of Andrew Mansioun.

Carved roundels with the coats of arms of Mary of Guise, Henry II of France, and Regent Arran decorated a house in Blythe's Close on the Castlehill, the upper stretch of the Royal Mile in Edinburgh. It is thought the house may have been a lodging used by Mary of Guise. These carvings were acquired by the National Museums of Scotland in 2021. Perhaps in 1558, similar roundels were carved for the audience chamber of Holyrood Palace. These armorials were originally painted with bright colours using orpiment and azurite. No documentation survives to name the carvers of the Edinburgh armorials.

=== Making and decorating cannon ===
Andrew Mansion made moulds or patterns for six cannon with lion heads and fleur-de-lys, cast under the direction of Hans Cochrane in December 1540. James V employed French, Flemish, Danish, and German gunners. A French master of ordinance, Christopher Grandmaseaw, was sent to France and other countries in 1541 to buy equipment.

The gun foundry was in Edinburgh Castle. The Treasurer's accounts detail Andrew Mansioun's work engraving the royal cannon in March 1542 in these words;

Gevin to Andres Mensioun for graving of the Kingis grace armes with unicornis, thrissillis, and flour de lyces upoune the samin piece, and graving of the dait of yere upoune the mouth thairof, and upoun ..., sindry utheris pieces sett in task by Johnne Drummond to him, £13-6s-8d.

Four Scottish falconets with 'IRS' (Iacobus Rex Scotorum) royal ciphers were captured by the English at the battle of Solway Moss, and another was recovered from Castle Semple Loch and is now in the collection of Glasgow Museums.

=== St Giles' Kirk ===
Andrew Mansioun also worked for Edinburgh town with an annual retainer of 10 merks. He made stools for St Giles Cathedral and in 1554 he completed the quire stalls and a new door to the quire. During this work Mansioun had a team of three carpenters working for him, described as his servants, and the town employed two labourers, Home and Hainslie, to fetch and carry for him. In July 1559, during the crisis of the Scottish Reformation, the new stalls were removed for safety to the Nether Tolbooth. In June 1560, the Dean of Guild, James Barroun, was asked to organise the making of new seating from the timber stored at the Tolbooth.

=== Edinburgh tolbooth and the fortress on Inchkeith ===
The gunners' expertise with ropes lifting cannon was also used by the town council. On 22 February 1555, Andrew and two Flemish colleagues from the royal artillery met the town's master wrights to discuss how the new timberwork of Tolbooth belfy and steeple would be hauled into position. The following Monday the work began, and in the next week the framework of the belfry, called a "brandrauth" was raised by 28 men "by force at once."

In the autumn of 1555, Mansioun was based on the island of Inchkeith where he was in charge of horses and winches during the building of a fortress designed by a Siennese architect Lorenzo Pomarelli for Mary of Guise.

=== An altarpiece for Chapel Royal at Holyrood Palace ===
In May 1559 Mary of Guise had a new altarpiece installed in the Chapel Royal at Holyrood House. Exchequer documents show that she ordered paintings from Flanders for the altarpiece, and Andrew Mansioun contributed to making the frame.

== Mary, Queen of Scots ==
On 28 December 1561, Mary, Queen of Scots made him 'Master Wrycht and Gunnare ordinare' for life. For this, Andrew had a monthly salary of £8-6s-8d. In August 1579, on his death, the position was given to his son Francis.

Andrew Mansioun and several of the royal gunners and wrights went north to Aberdeen at the time of the battle of Corrichie in October 1562.

The queen is known have had the configuration of some of her beds altered. It has been suggested a payment of £120 Scots to Mansioun in May 1566 was for making a cradle in expectation of the birth of Prince James at Edinburgh Castle.

=== Nicholas Guillebault the upholsterer ===
Mary, Queen of Scots had her own French carpenter or upholster in her household to make and mend her furniture, beds, coffers and palace fixtures, Nicolas Guillebault. He was described as a valet de fourriére and menusier. His companion was Pierre Somville or Domville. There are several payments to "Nycolas Guillebank" in the treasurer's accounts, which show that he did some upholstery, but they do not give much detail of his work. Another menusier, Mathieu, lined boxes and covered bed posts in November 1562.

In June 1564, Nicholas worked with an embroiderer to cover and line a casket with black velvet and black satin which Mary used to keep her papers in. Guillebault upholstered chairs, stools, and a close stool in October 1566, and covered stools and chairs with "peaux de marroquy", Morocco leather, in October. He was paid for upholstering a chair for James VI at Stirling Castle with blue velvet in October 1567.

== Life and family ==
Little is known of Andrew's origins, but the Scottish exchequer records consistently describe him as French. As one of the royal gunners, Andrew was hurt defending Edinburgh Castle from the English invasion of 1544 that opened the war of the Rough Wooing. One of his own cannon had backfired, and in June 1544 he was given 44 shillings to pay for treatment to his hand. Later, his salary or pension was increased to compensate him for his hand's lameness.

Andrew stayed in Edinburgh, where he had his own workshop (a buith), and the terms of his pension or retainer of 10 marks in 1544 mention his sons. He joined the Edinburgh incorporation of masons, wrights, glaziers, and painters. From September 1555 he was one of four master craftsmen who judged the assay pieces of tables or dressers made by carpenters who wanted to become free masters of the craft. He was also resident in the Canongate, at that a time a separate jurisdiction to Edinburgh, where he was an elder of the kirk in August 1567 and served on the Canongate burgh council in 1568 and 1569. The burgh of Edinburgh rewarded him with the income that had endowed the altar of Saint Mary in Saint Giles' Kirk.

He was paid his royal pension of £16 in January 1579 and a further £29 in April and this is last record of him. Another royal gunner, Robert Robertson, made furniture for James VI, including a table in September 1579.

== Francis Mansioun ==
Several descendants continued as carpenters (called "wrights" in Scots). Francis Mansioun, who took his place as a gunner at Edinburgh Castle in August 1579, was probably the eldest son. He was the chief carpenter at Holyrood Palace for repairs made in September 1579, shortly before James VI came to Edinburgh from Stirling. Francis Mansioun was the official of the trade organisation in Edinburgh as 'Deacon of the Wrights' in 1595, and as such he was asked to comment on the repair of St Giles Cathedral. Francis made an oak pulpit for the Kirk of Falkland in August 1602. Joshua and Isaac Mansioun, probably siblings, were also Deacons of the Wrights in Edinburgh, and John Mansioun married to Barbara Kello was also a wright in Edinburgh in 1603.

== Flemish carpenters ==
James Rokno, the son of Mansioun's Flemish colleague Tibault Rokno, also stayed in Edinburgh and became a gunner of the royal artillery. James Rokno was made master wright and gunner as his "guid-father" James Hectour had been in 1584, and Rokno's old position was given to David Selkirk. In 1589 he was the gunner on the James, the ship that took James VI to Norway to meet his bride Anne of Denmark.
