= James Hamilton of Finnart =

Scottish nobleman and architect (c. 1495–1540)

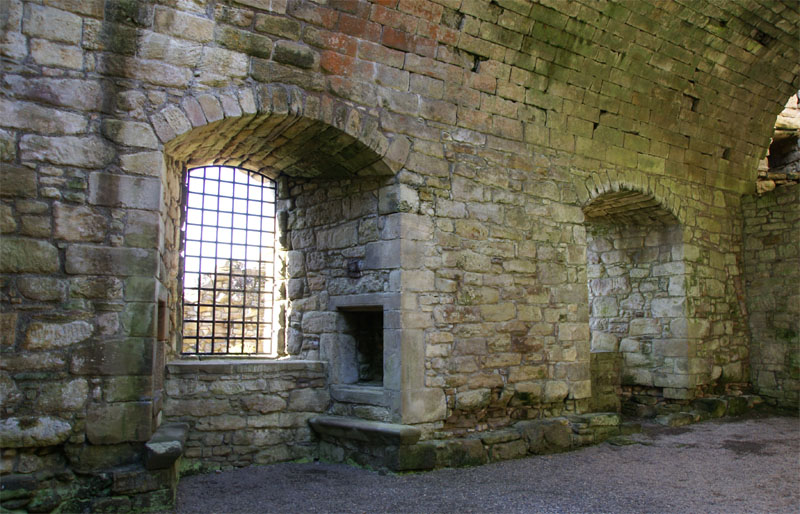
The hall Hamilton of Finnart built for himself at Craignethan Castle

Sir James Hamilton of Finnart (c. 1495 – 16 August 1540) was a Scottish nobleman and architect, the illegitimate son of James Hamilton, 1st Earl of Arran, and Marion Boyd of Bonshaw. Although legitimated in 1512 while still a minor, he continued to be known as the "Bastard of Arran". As a key member of the Hamilton family, and second cousin of James V, King of Scotland, he became a prominent member of Scottish society.

== Rise ==
The nurse of a child of Marion Boyd is mentioned in the royal accounts in February 1498, when James IV was at Ayr.

Hamilton was granted the lands of Finnart in 1507 and knighted at a young age in 1511. As a child he joined the king's household and was given gifts of boots and shoes. In 1513 he was accepted as his father's heir, should his father not have legitimate heirs, which he later did. During the winter 1517/18 James was in France and brought back letters from Francis I to Scotland. At the end of March 1518 he returned to France with replies concerning the murder of Antoine d'Arces, sieur de la Bastie and his father's actions against the culprits. Arran struggled with Regent Albany and James V later in 1526 formally forgave him, Arran, the Earl of Eglinton, Lord Avandale, Hugh Campbell of Loudoun, and others for bearing arms against Albany with 5000 or 6000 men at "Kittycrocehill" by Glasgow.

In 1520 Hamilton played a part in provoking the "Clear the Causeway" fight with the Earl of Angus in Edinburgh's High Street. Hamilton and his father managed to escape from the skirmish by stealing horses and crossing the Nor Loch marshes. In September 1526 Hamilton murdered John Stewart, 3rd Earl of Lennox, who had surrendered to the Hamilton side following the Battle of Linlithgow Bridge. On 22 October 1526, Hamilton was made Keeper and Captain of Linlithgow Palace with a legal ceremony involving the symbolic presentation of stones and earth followed by his entry to the palace and the closure of the doors behind him.

George Buchanan wrote that in revenge for the murder of Lennox a groom from the earl's stable stabbed Hamilton at the Pend of Holyroodhouse. Unharmed, at court he was made principal sewer, a noble waiter at the king's table, and master of the king's stables. He was involved in persecution of the Protestants, including his own cousin Patrick Hamilton, who was burnt at the stake in 1528. When his father died in 1529, he became guardian of his half-brother the nine or ten-year-old James, 2nd Earl of Arran, and was for a time the most influential of the Hamilton dynasty, and one of the most powerful men in Scotland.

In November 1528 he was described by an English diplomat Thomas Magnus with disapproval as one of the young king's counsellors, as "Sir James Hamylton, whoe did sley the Erle of Lenneux." Magnus thought Finnart and other unsuitable courtiers including the Sheriff of Ayr, the Laird of Buccleuch, Lord Maxwell, and Lord Methven, the husband of Margaret Tudor were responsible for continuing the forfeit and attainder of the Earl of Angus. However, Magnus also heard that Finnart and the Sheriff of Ayr, two "cherished servants" of James V met the forfeited rebels Archibald Douglas of Kilspindie and George Douglas of Pittendreich at Cockburnspath to discuss the restoration of the Earldom of Angus. This meeting and familiarity with Douglas family would later be used against Finnart.

=== Master of Work for building royal palaces and castles ===
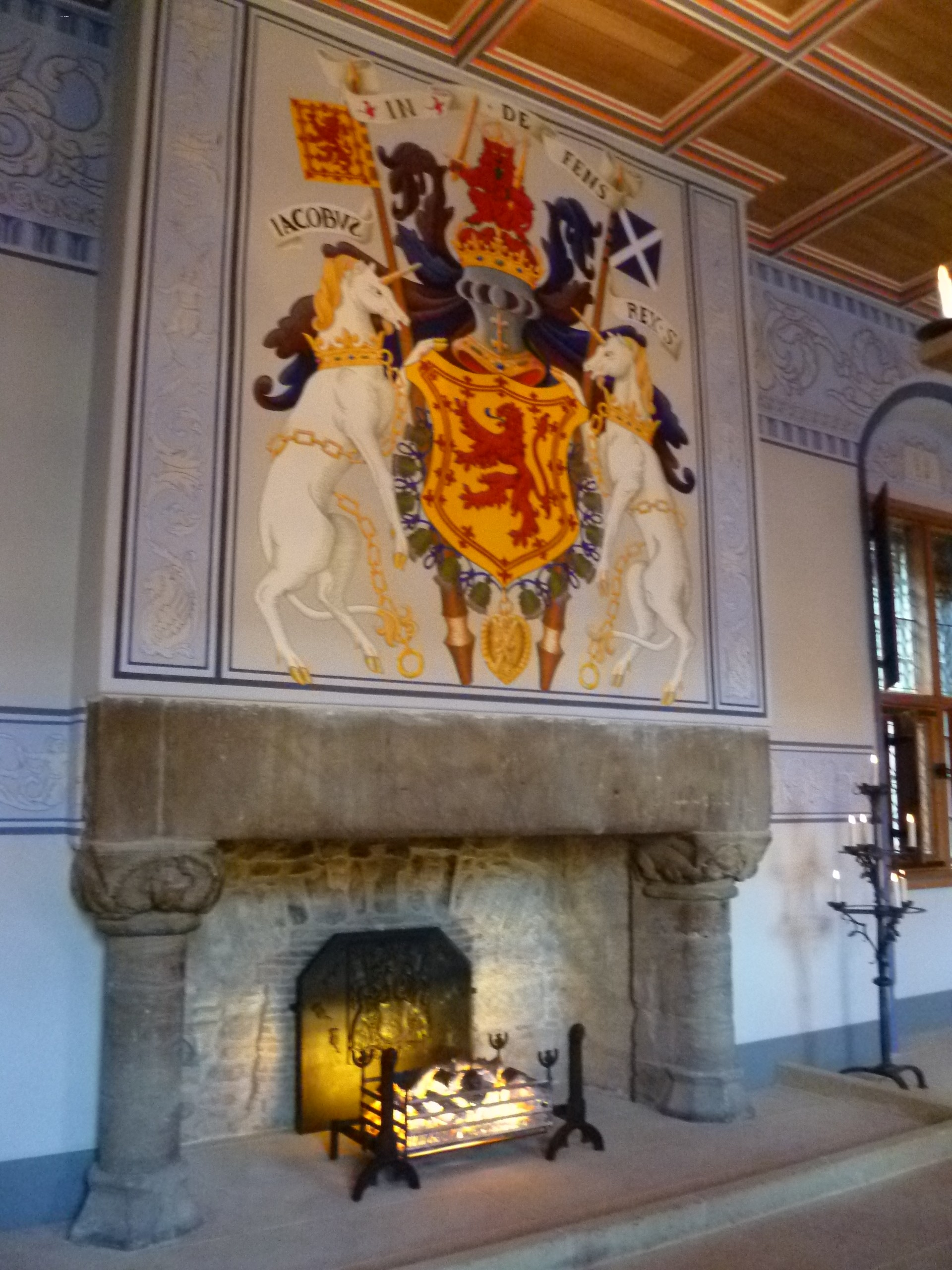
Fireplace in Stirling Palace, built for James V by James Hamilton of Finnart, (interior restored 2010)

He was appointed Steward of the Royal Household and Master of Works to King James. King James granted Hamilton the Draffan estate in Lanarkshire, on which he built Craignethan Castle in 1530. He probably also built Cadzow Castle near the South Lanarkshire town now known as Hamilton. In Linlithgow, Hamilton acquired the site of a large townhouse from his cousin James Hamilton of Kincavill in January 1531.

In 1536, Hamilton supplied James V with equipment for hunting horses, hounds and hawks, and the King ordered Patrick, Lord Gray, who was indebted to the crown, to pay him 850 Scottish merks.

As Master of Works, he was responsible for restorations to the royal palaces of Linlithgow, Blackness Castle and possibly Falkland Palace. His major work was creating the renaissance palace at Stirling for which he was richly rewarded.

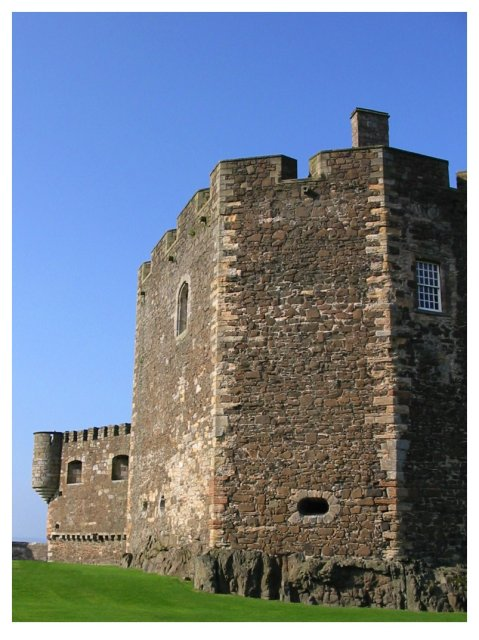
Some gunloops at Blackness Castle date from Finnart's works

In 1537, the treasurer allowed Finnart the composition fee for the Wardship of the heir of Patrick Butter of Gormo against £133-6s-8d he had spent at Linlithgow and Blackness Castle. This pattern of financing continued, and at Stirling Castle on 22 September 1539, Finnart was given a substantial gift of lands in recompense for his service in completing works at Stirling Palace and Linlithgow Palace, including; Strathaven Castle, Crawfordjohn, Gorgie in Renfrewshire, and other lands made into a barony of Avondale. Finnart's building work continued at Stirling Palace with an advance of £4000 Scots in October 1539, and £300 for works at Linlithgow and Blackness Castle in April 1540.

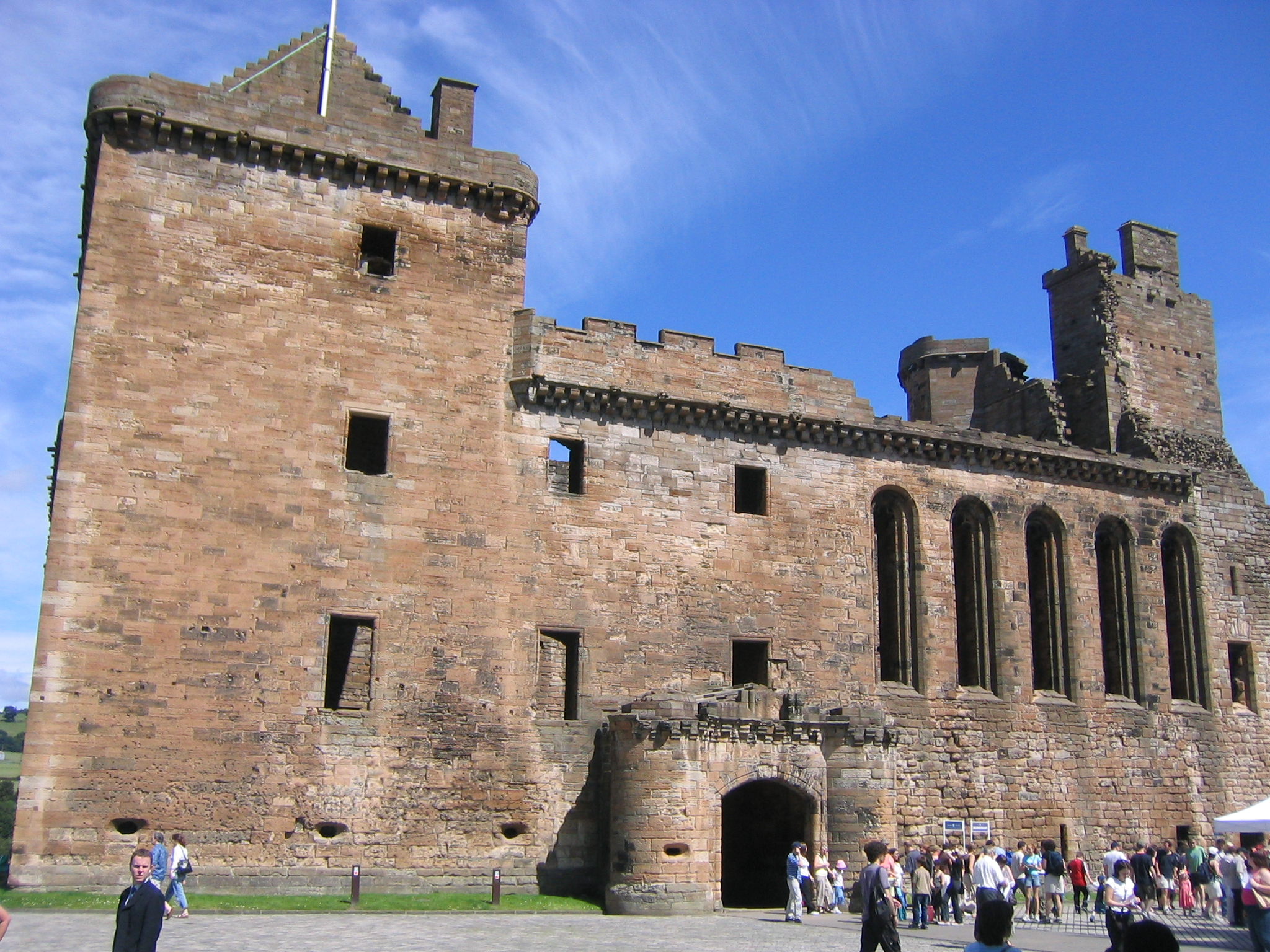
At Linlithgow Palace, Hamilton of Finnart reconstructed the entrance façade

A later historian, William Drummond of Hawthornden, mentioned an advance of 3000 Crowns in April 1540 for rebuilding a castle on the Isle of Bute, meaning Rothesay Castle, but this is not recorded in the royal accounts. After his execution in August 1540, Finnart left debts for the building work at Stirling Palace. The royal blacksmith, William Hill, was paid for the ironwork and yetts he had made in August 1541. As late as January 1542, Edward Lytall's wife was paid £487 for the ironwork and timber she had supplied. A priest, sir James Nycholsoun, finished off the work at Stirling, which Finnart had begun in May 1538, spending £1459-15s-10d before Christmas 1540, and a carpenter Robert Robertson was appointed master of work to complete the palace.

== Fall ==
In 1540 King James became convinced that Hamilton was plotting against him, although no evidence for this was presented. Arrested on charges of treason in late July, on 16 August Hamilton was tried, convicted and executed. Amongst the charges presented on 16 August, were these, which dated back 12 years, and suggest concerns about the security of the royal bedchamber;

"Sir James Hamilton of Finnart, having been convicted of the treasonable shooting of guns and firing of missiles outside the palace of Linlithgow and from the bell-tower of the same, at the king and the people in his company, both at the time the king came to the palace and when he withdrew from the same, and especially at his lodging place in the same town, the king being personally present at the time of the firing of the said missiles. And for art and part in the treasonable imagination, planning, and consultation, vulgarly called devising, of assassinations, at the time it is said he was with Archibald Douglas of Kilspindie and James Douglas of Parkhead at the chapel of St Leonard near Edinburgh, after the forfeiture of Archibald Douglas, formerly Earl of Angus, George Douglas of Pittendreich his brother, and the said Archibald Douglas, his father, and also during the siege of Tantallon Castle in consultation with the said Douglases, how he would enter by the window near the upper part of the bed, 'the bedhead' (superiorem thori - literally above the pillows), in the King's palace near Holyrood Abbey, and how there he would commit the slaughter of the King. And for common treason and conspiracy against the King, his realm and lieges. Therefore it was given that this James forfeited his life, lands, rents and possessions to the king as his escheat, to remain with him in perpetuity."

After Finnart was beheaded at Edinburgh, James V seized Craignethan Castle. He installed a garrison led by James and David Orrok. The silverwork from the chapel was taken to Edinburgh and engraved by John Mosman with the arms of the king's infant eldest son, James, Duke of Rothesay. James V redeemed two silver flagons from Mungo Tennant, a merchant who had lent Finnart money which he used to pay for hauling timber to the building work at Stirling Castle.

A chest with Finnart's papers was brought to Edinburgh, and many of these were destroyed by crown officers. Cardinal Beaton gave money to his widow, as she was his relative.

After his death, Finnart is said to have appeared to James V in a dream, and declared that he "would shortly lose both arms, then his head." This prophecy came true, as the King lost both of his young sons in 1541, and died himself in 1542. The story was recorded by John Knox and George Buchanan.

== Evidence and theories on Finnart's execution ==
The execution of James Hamilton of Finnart has historical interest as an incident that has been cited as evidence of arbitrary cruelty and greed in the behaviour of James V. This and other aspects of the story were discussed in the History of the Five Jameses by William Drummond of Hawthornden first published in 1655. Another theme, which is based on George Buchanan's History of Scotland, sees Finnart as a close associate of Cardinal Beaton and active in the support of the Catholic Church, would identify his enemies as Protestant interests in Scotland. George Buchanan alleges that Finnart was a judge in trials of heresy, and his account of Finnart's arrest and trial mentions particularly the roles of James Learmonth of Dairsie, Master of Household, and James Kirkcaldy of Grange as Protestants with the Catholic Secretary Thomas Erskine of Haltoun. In Buchanan's story these three became committed to Finnart's execution after arresting him on the King's orders. John Knox however merely gives the story of the King's haunting, and writes he would not comment whether the execution was just or unjust.

Finnart was supposed to have prevented James V meeting Henry VIII of England and possibly marrying Princess Mary and then hindering the King's French marriage plans by leading his ships off-course in August 1536. At the time, the English ambassador William Howard heard that Finnart was working to arrange the King's marriage to his mistress, Margaret Erskine.

An anti-Hamilton narrative account written in 1570 shortly after James Hamilton of Bothwellhaugh had assassinated Regent Moray, gives an insight into Finnart's execution and his possible motivations. This account mentions that the charges against Finnart were old, dating from just after the departure of John Stewart, Duke of Albany in 1524. As noted in the records of the Parliament of Scotland, Finnart was accused of planning to kill James V at Holyroodhouse. Though this plan was not executed, the writer in 1570 added that Finnart persevered to delay the King's marriage so that the Hamilton family would succeed as kings of Scotland. The Hamiltons were supposed to have hoped the King might die by misfortune without heirs. According to this 1570s account, which Cecil noted as an 'Exhortation to the Lords of Council against the Hamiltons,' from that time forth Finnart was in disfavour. Robert Lindsay of Pitscottie, the writer of a chronicle history, shares this bias against the Hamilton family and Hamilton of Finnart.

The reasons for Finnart's execution remain unclear and some recent writers, such as Jamie Cameron doubt that his role and significance was as pivotal as the author of the 'Exhortation' suggests. Some evidence suggests that Finnart was not unambiguously an ally of the Douglases. Letters written by Douglas agents following James V's journey in France in October 1536 (and intercepted by the English) reported that Finnart was not in favour and that the king had said to John Drummond of Milnab when they were aboard ship; "If I would but once look merely upon the earl of Angus, Sir James would droop; for by the wounds of God, for all Sir James' bragging, the earl of Angus and he never met but Sir James turned ever the back seams of his hose."

== Family ==
Finnart married Margaret Livingston of Easter Wemyss some time before 1529, and had issue:

1. James Hamilton of Crawfordjohn
2. Agnes Hamilton, who married James Somerville, 6th Lord Somerville
3. Grissel Hamilton who married Andrew Leslie, 5th Earl of Rothes in 1548.
4. Elizabeth Hamilton, who married John Maxwell of Calderwood.

A Somerville family history states that James V attended the wedding of Agnes at Craignethan, perhaps on 8 April 1536, but the modern historian Jamie Cameron doubted this tradition.

In addition, James fathered at least ten illegitimate children, to at least three mistresses, Marion Stewart, Elizabeth Murray, and Elizabeth Elphinstone.

1. Andrew Hamilton
2. James Hamilton senior
3. Alexander Hamilton
4. James Hamilton, junior, (b. 1520)
5. Agnes Hamilton.

== Sources ==
- Cameron, Jamie, James V, the personal rule, Tuckwell (1998), 191–227.
- McKean, Charles, 'Hamilton of Finnart', History Today, (January 1993)
- McKean, Charles, 'The Castle of the Bastard of Arran', PSAS, vol. 125, (1995), 1069-1090
- McKean, Charles: 'Sir James Hamilton of Finnart: a Renaissance Courtier-Architect', Architectural History, vol. 42, SAHGB, (1999), 141–72.

Preceded by Sir James Nicolson	Master of Work to the Crown of Scotland; 1538–1540	Succeeded by John Hamilton of Milnburne & John Scrimgeour of Myres
