= Alexander Jardine of Applegarth =

Scottish landowner and soldier

Alexander Jardine of Applegarth (died 1530) was a Scottish landowner and soldier.

He was a nephew of John Jardine of Applegarth.

Applegarthtown is in Dumfries and Galloway.

Jardine became Master of Artillery for James V of Scotland.

In 1515 Margaret Tudor left Linlithgow Palace and went to back to England, on her way leaving a coffer containing her jewels at Tantallon Castle. Alexander Jardine accepted custody of the coffer.

He was involved in the siege of Tantallon Castle in 1528, held against the king by the Douglas family. He was ordered to consult with the gunners Robert Borthwick and John Drummond about the artillery needed. Tents were required for the gunners and timber to make "apparelling" to shelter the guns from enemy fire.

He married Elizabeth Maxwell. Their children included:

- John Jardine of Applegarth, who married Elizabeth Douglas

A "Sanders Jardine", apparently of a younger generation, was also captain of Tantallon Castle, and an enemy of Cardinal Beaton. During the war known as the Rough Wooing, in April 1544 shortly before the Burning of Edinburgh, he swore that he would deliver the castle to the English, as instructed by the Master of Morton.
