= Tantallon Castle =

Castle in Scotland

- East Lothian, Scotland; OSGB grid reference NT596851
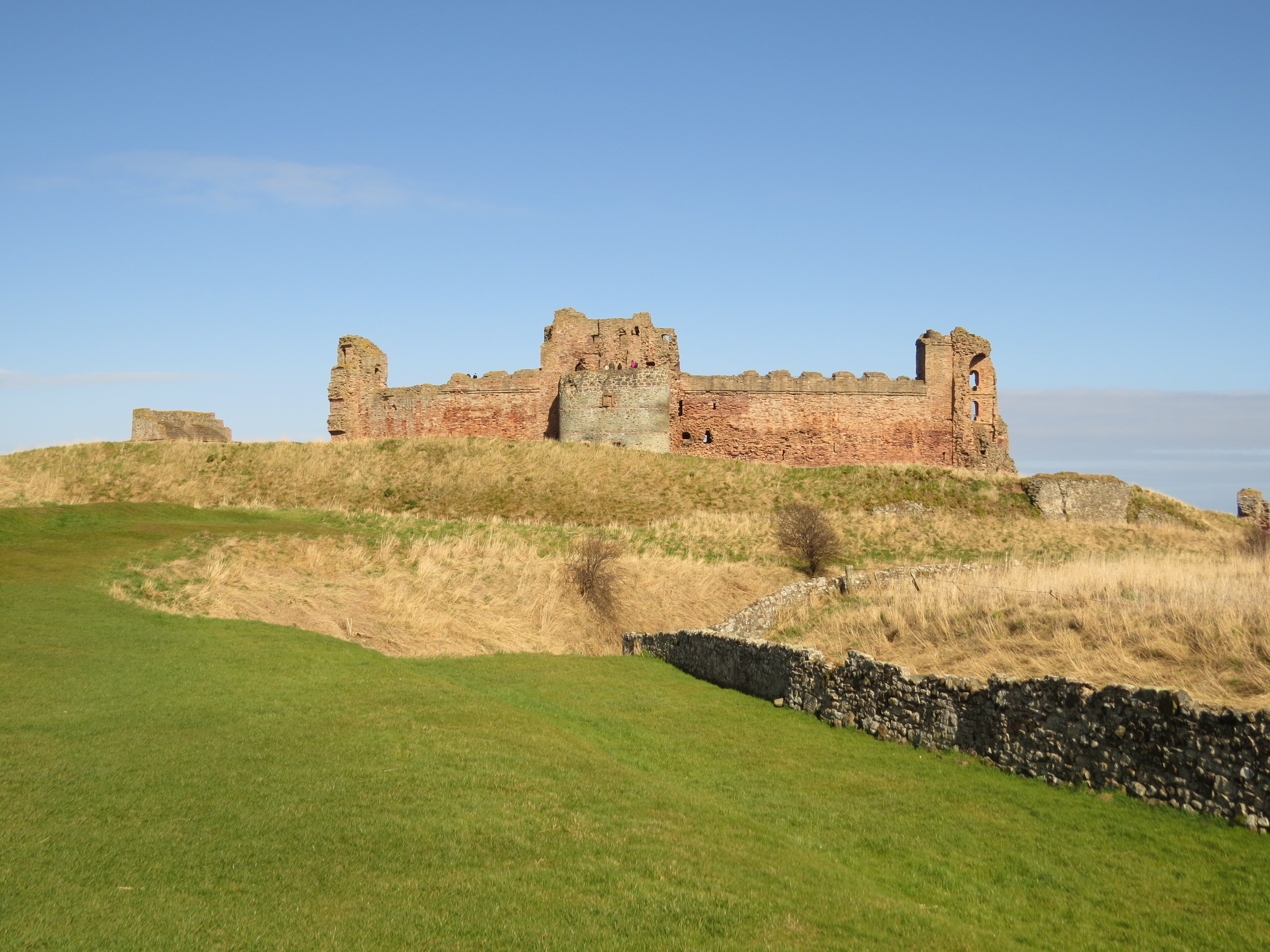
- Approach to Tantallon from the south

Site information
- Type: Castle of enceinte
- Owner: Historic Environment Scotland
- Controlled by: Earl of Angus
- Open to the public: Yes
- Condition: Ruined

Location
- Location of Tantallon within East Lothian
- Location within East Lothian
- Coordinates: 56.0564°N 2.6506°W

Site history
- Built: c.1350
- Built by: William Douglas, 1st Earl of Douglas
- In use: Until 1650
- Materials: Stone

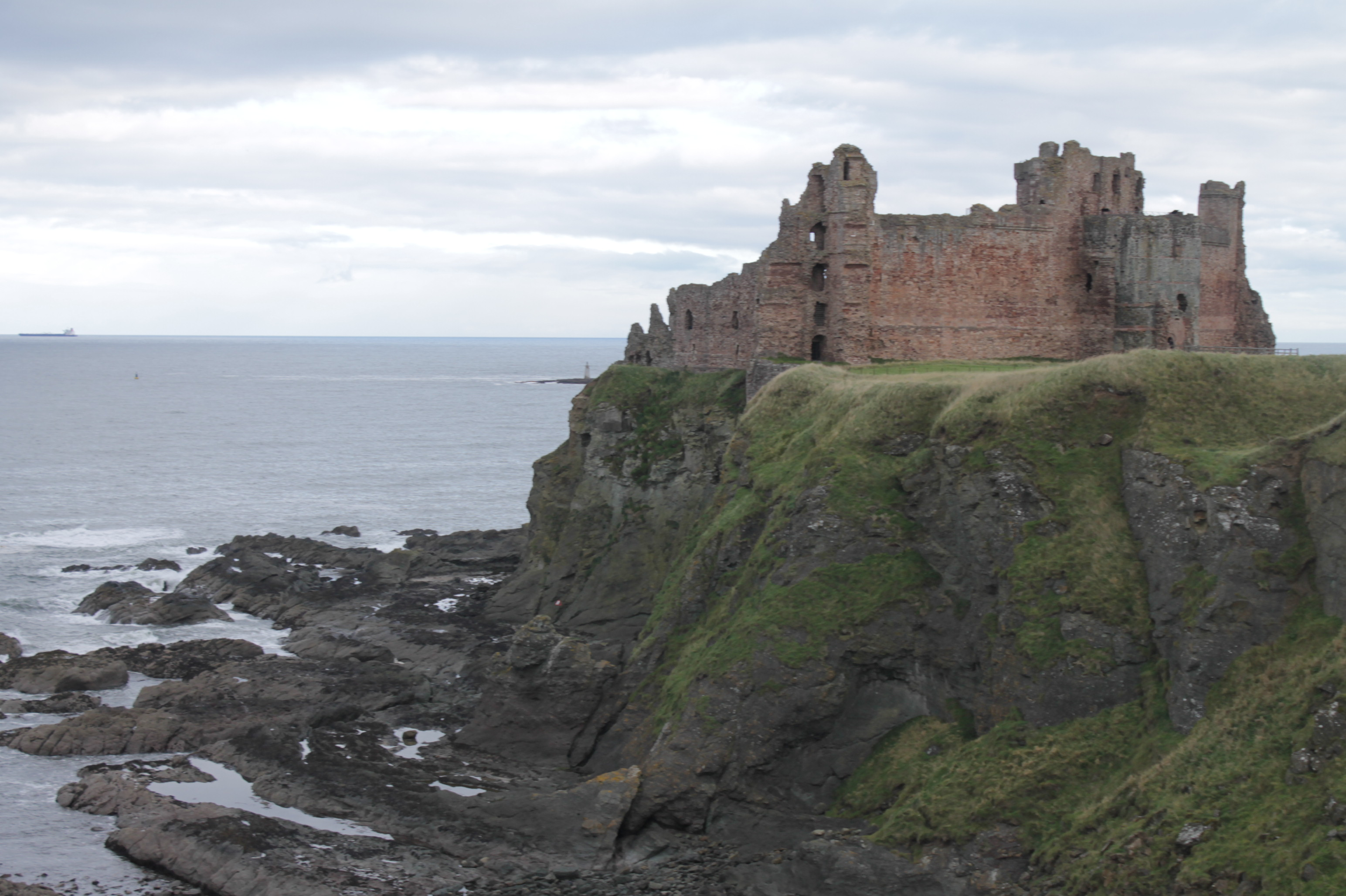
Tantallon Castle from the west

Tantallon Castle is a ruined mid-14th-century fortress, located 5 kilometres (3.1 mi) east of North Berwick, in East Lothian, Scotland. It sits atop a promontory opposite the Bass Rock, looking out onto the Firth of Forth. The last medieval curtain wall castle to be constructed in Scotland, Tantallon comprises a single wall blocking off the headland, with the other three sides naturally protected by sea cliffs.

Tantallon was built in the mid 14th century by William Douglas, 1st Earl of Douglas. It was passed to his illegitimate son, George Douglas, later created Earl of Angus, and despite several sieges, it remained the property of his descendants for much of its history. It was besieged by King James IV in 1491, and again by his successor James V in 1527, when extensive damage was done. Tantallon saw action in the First Bishops' War in 1639, and again during Oliver Cromwell's invasion of Scotland in 1651, when it was once more severely damaged. It was sold by the Marquis of Douglas in 1699 to Hew Dalrymple, Lord North Berwick and the ruin is today in the care of Historic Environment Scotland.

== Construction ==
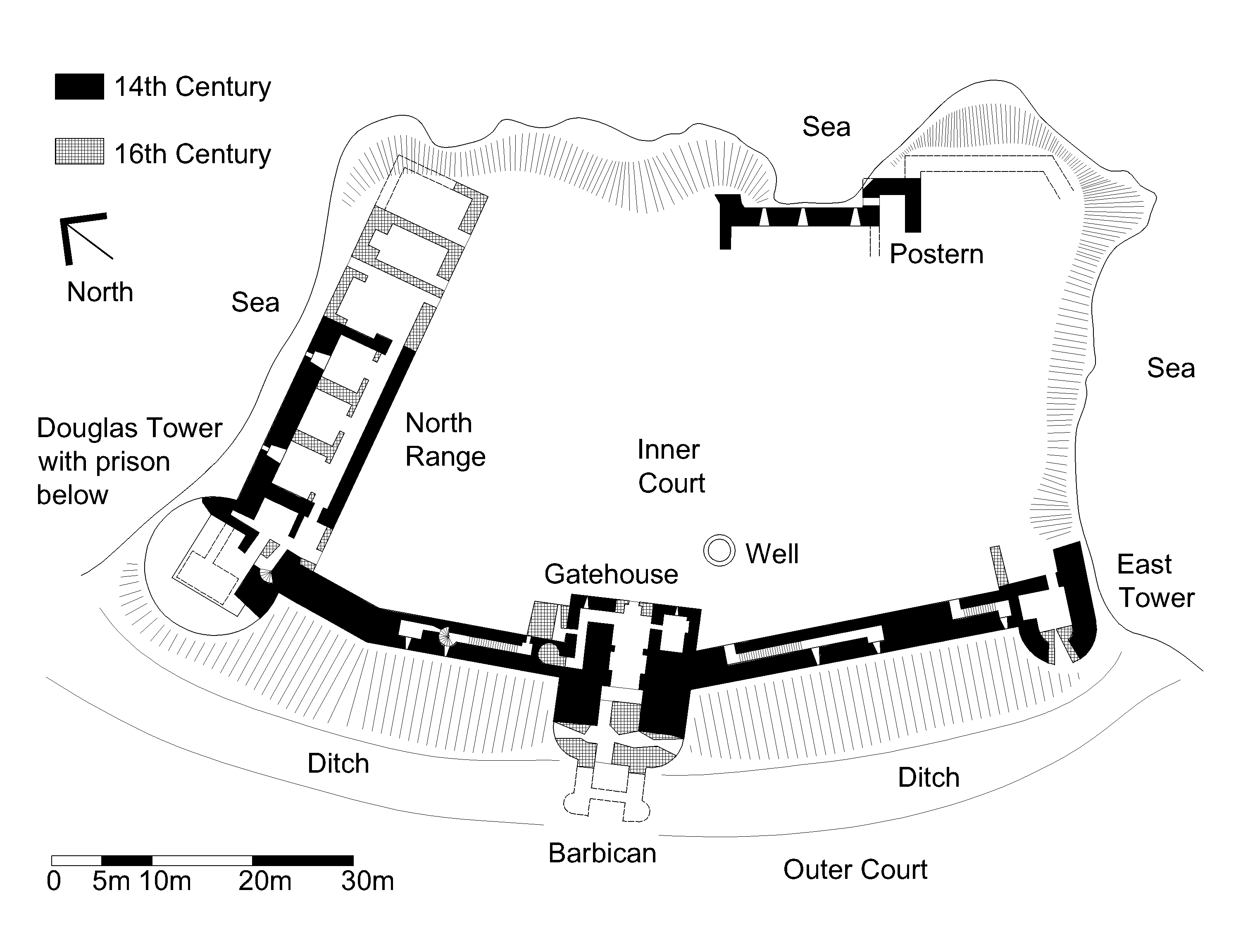
Plan of the inner court of Tantallon Castle

Tantallon is a unique construction within Scotland, the defences comprising only a single large wall securing a coastal promontory. The south-east, north-east, and north-west approaches are naturally defended by steep sea cliffs and were only ever protected by relatively small defensive walls. To the southwest, a massive curtain wall blocks off the end of the promontory, which forms the inner courtyard. The curtain wall is built of the local red sandstone and has a tower at each end and a heavily fortified gatehouse in the centre, all of which provided residential accommodation. A north range of buildings, containing a hall, completed the main part of the castle, enclosing a courtyard around 70 by 44 metres (230 by 144 ft). In total, the buildings of the castle provided around 1,100 square metres (12,000 sq ft) of accommodation.

In its form, Tantallon follows on from the 12th-century castles of Bothwell and Kildrummy, as a castle of enceinte, or curtain wall castle. It was the last of this type to be built in Scotland, as the smaller tower house was becoming increasingly popular. For example, Threave Castle, built at around the same time by Earl William's cousin Archibald the Grim, is a much more modest tower. There are also similarities between Tantallon and "courtyard" castles, such as Doune, which also dates from the late 14th century, and is entered via a passage beneath a strong keep tower.

=== Curtain wall ===
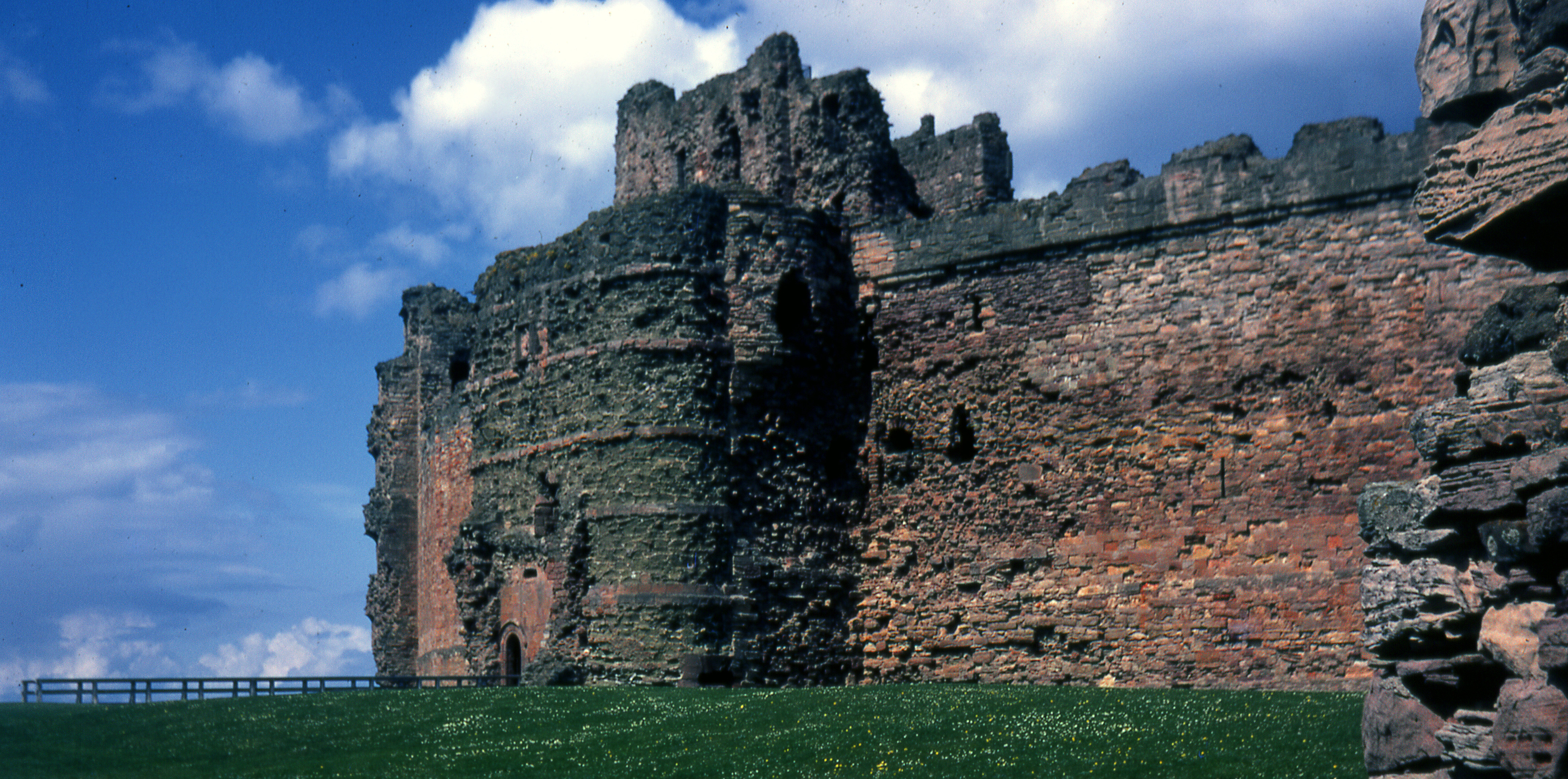
Curtain wall, with the gatehouse in the centre

The curtain wall is over 15 metres (49 ft) high, 3.6 metres (12 ft) thick, and around 90 metres (300 ft) long. There are several small chambers within the walls, and stairs with arched ceilings accessing the parapet walk. This parapet walk, beneath the 16th-century crenels of the curtain wall, connects the three towers.

The northwest tower, known as the Douglas Tower, was circular in plan and 12 metres (39 ft) across, although the west side has collapsed. Seven storeys high, this tower would have formed the lord's "donjon", or keep, containing his private accommodation, and connecting to the hall in the north range. The lowest storey was a pit prison and the timber-floored chambers above were square, with vaulted garderobes or privies.

The East Tower is of D-plan, with the curved face outwards, and is 9 metres (30 ft) across. Originally consisting of five storeys, the bottom three were reduced to two after the 1528 siege, by the insertion of stone vaults. Large gun ports were also added in the basement at this time. The third floor of the tower was designed to have access to a parapet on the south-east wall, although this wall was never built.

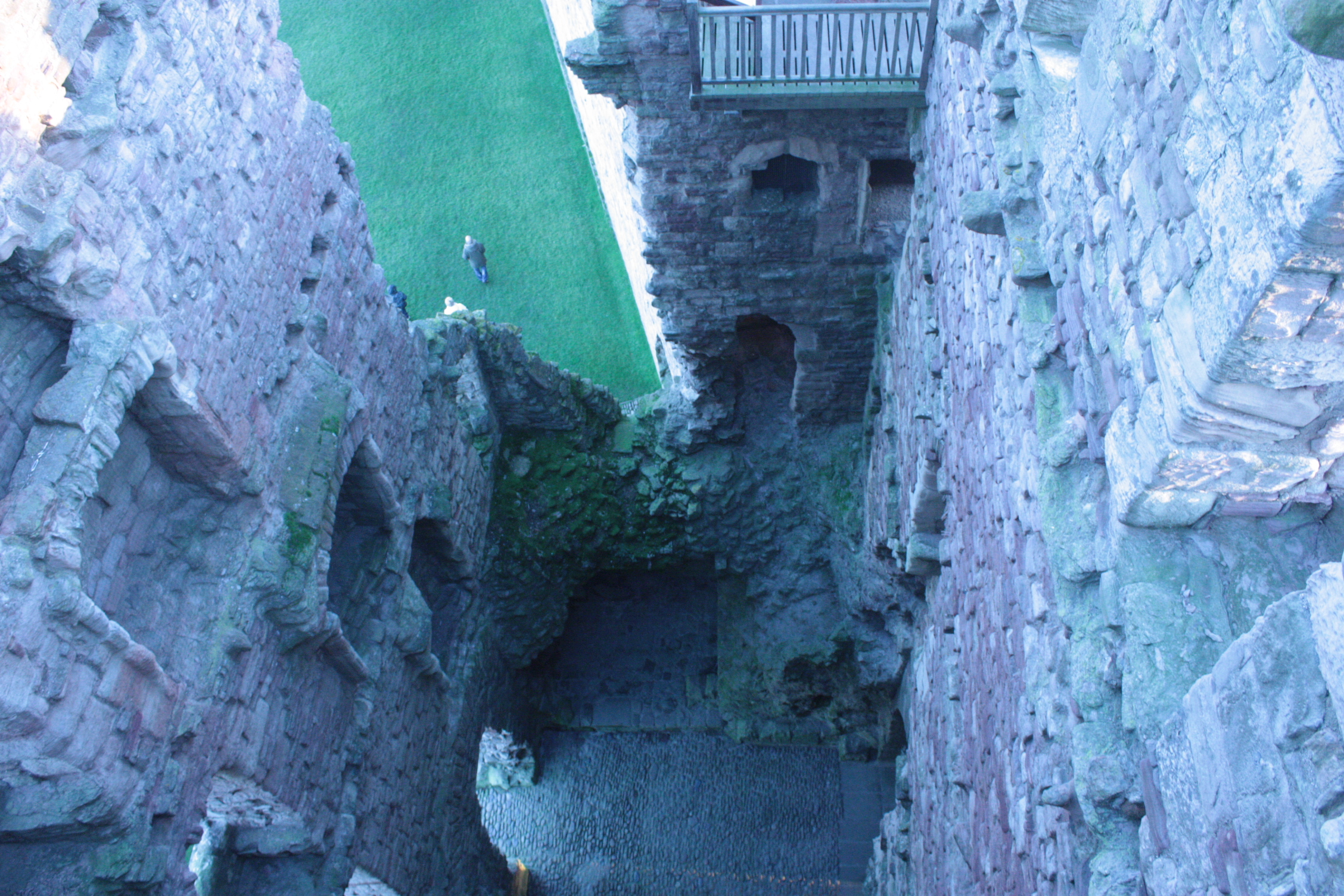
Inner court, void above entrance

The central gatehouse tower is square, 13 metres (43 ft) across, and up to 24 metres (79 ft) high. It contained four storeys of chambers, some with canopied fireplaces, although the internal walls and floors are now missing. The main entrance ran through a passage below, protected by a drawbridge, three pairs of doors, a portcullis, and machicolations; holes in the ceiling enabling the defenders to drop missiles on to intruders below. There are two bartizans, or corner turrets, facing in toward the courtyard, where a 16th-century spiral stair gives access to the head of the curtain wall. The entrance was originally via a pointed arched gateway, flanked by round towers. A defensive barbican, or outer gate, was added in the early 14th century and was destroyed in the 1528 siege, although fragments can still be seen. After the siege, the facade of the gatehouse was rebuilt, with more gun ports at ground level, and the gateway corridor was narrowed. The rebuilding covered up the remains of the earlier round towers, narrowed the main gate, and gave the tower rounded corners for additional strength.

=== Inner court ===
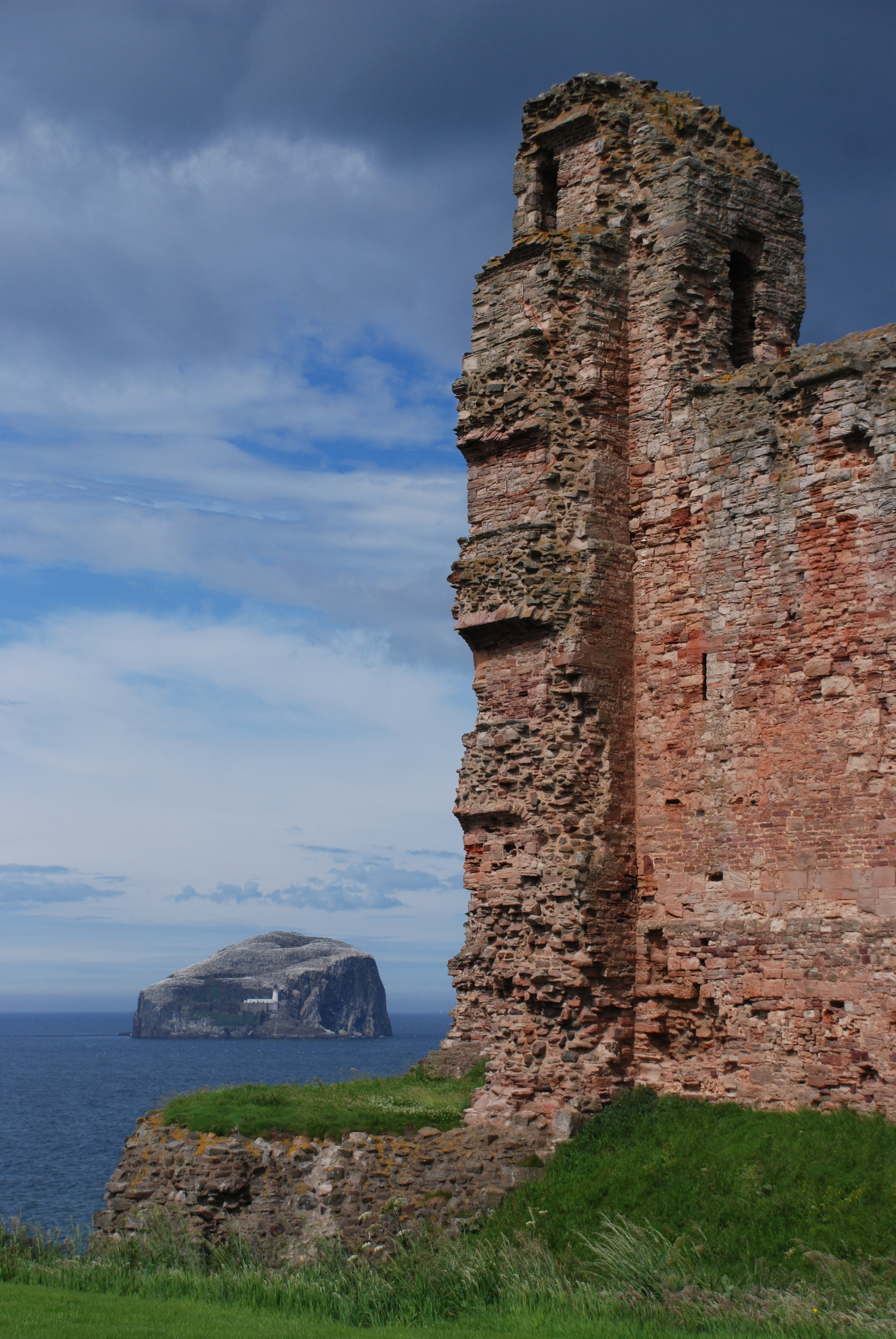
Ruins of the Douglas Tower, with the Bass Rock behind

The north range of buildings, around 10 by 40 metres (33 by 131 ft), is connected to the Douglas Tower. The western section dates from the 14th century and comprises the remains of the great hall, used by the lord, over the former laigh, or low, hall, used by the labourers, and later divided to form cellars. The marks of the hall's pitched roof can be seen on the inside wall of the Douglas Tower. The 16th-century eastern section contained a bakehouse and further private chambers and has partially collapsed into the sea. Only a small section of the other walls remains to the east, and contains a postern gate, giving access to the sea through a cleft in the cliffs below. The well is 32 metres (105 ft) deep, and was re-excavated in the 19th century.

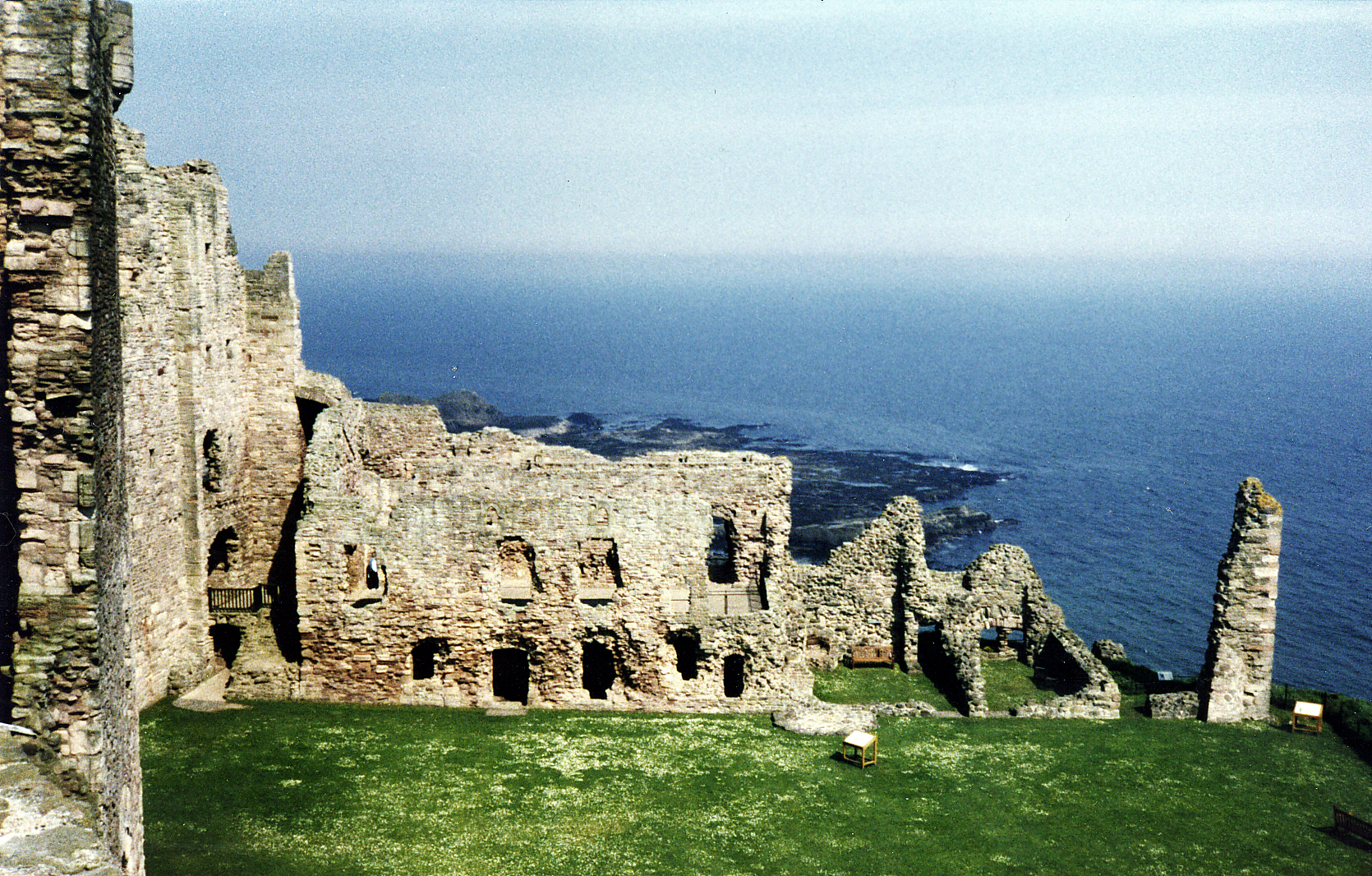
North range, seen from the gatehouse

=== Outer court ===
Alongside the curtain wall is a deep, rock-cut ditch, with a larger second ditch around 100 metres (330 ft) away, defining the outer court of the castle. Within the outer ditch are two mounds, which Charles McKean suggests may conceal 16th-century caponiers, defensive positions allowing covering fire along the trench. McKean notes that Sir James Hamilton of Finnart, the King's Master of Works, and a noted military engineer who built Scotland's only known caponiers at Craignethan and Blackness, was present with the King during the 1528 siege, and worked at Tantallon afterwards. A stone-fronted mound formerly ran along the outside of the ditch, although only a 30-metre (98 ft) section of the outer wall survives, at the south end, terminating in a two-storey round tower. This tower, with several gun ports, was built prior to the siege of 1528, and may have been inspired by the new artillery defences at nearby Dunbar Castle. A 17th-century "lectern" type doocot, or pigeon house, is the only building within the outer court. Beyond the outer ditch is a 17th-century ravelin, a triangular earthen artillery defence, and the remains of a third, smaller, ditch.

== History ==
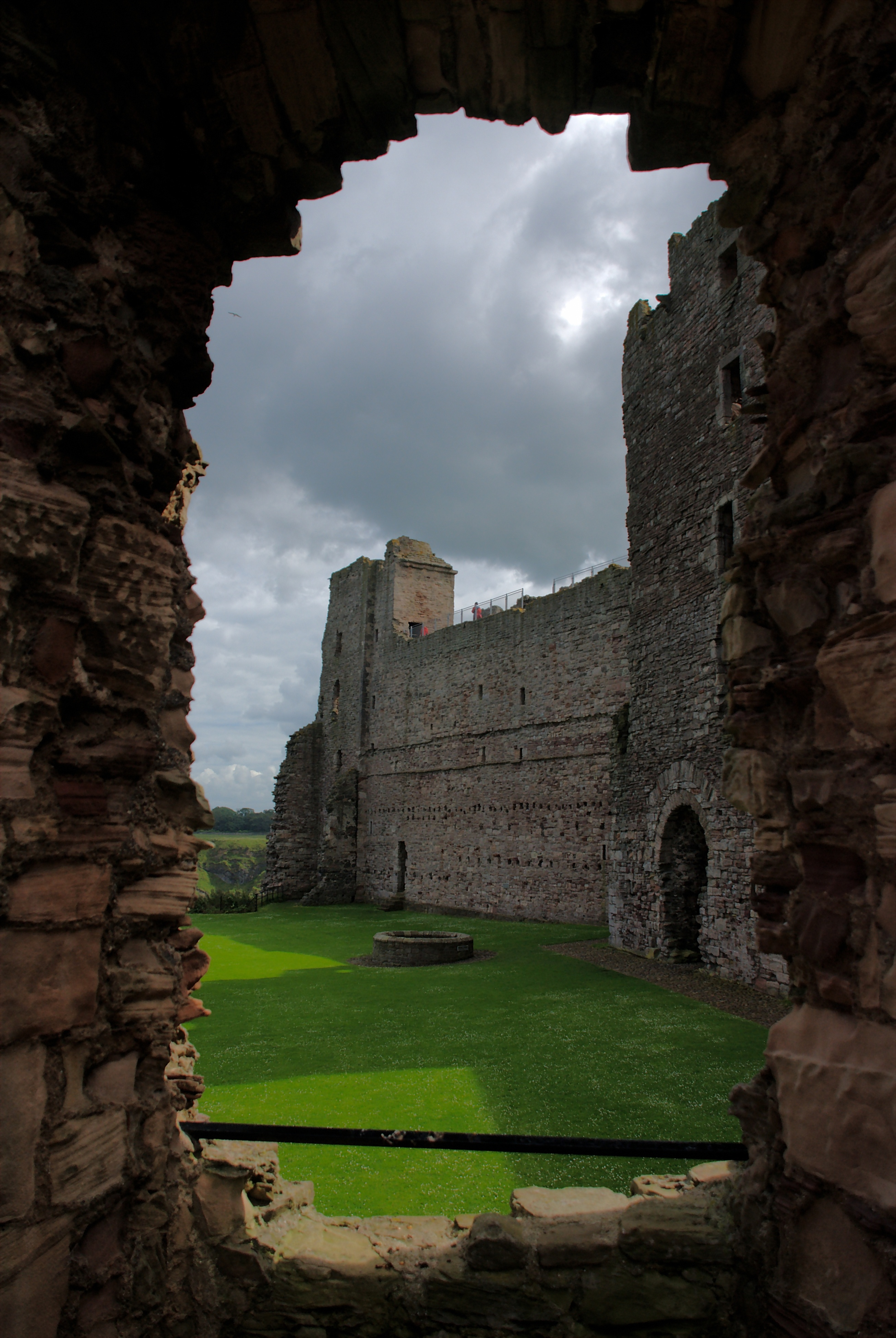
Inner face of the curtain wall from the north range

A map of the area, dated to before 1300, shows a castellated site with the name of "Dentaloune", possibly a corruption of the Brythonic din talgwn or "high-fronted fortress". The barony of North Berwick, including Tantallon, was in the possession of the Earls of Fife at this time.

=== Early history ===
In 1346, William Douglas (c. 1327–1384), nephew of Robert the Bruce's companion Sir James Douglas, had returned to Scotland, from France, to claim his inheritance as chief of the name of Douglas. By murdering his godfather, Sir William Douglas of Liddesdale, William became the undisputed head of the House of Douglas. He was created Earl of Douglas in 1358.

It is not clear how Douglas came to possess Tantallon, but in correspondence of 1374, he refers to it as "our castle of Temptaloun". Douglas may have been made castellan of Tantallon, as a tenant of Isabella, Countess of Fife, and it appears that he built the present castle either shortly before, or shortly after his elevation to the peerage, to reflect his new-found status. It was intended as a status symbol, although it followed the medieval curtain wall type, which at the time was becoming outmoded and superseded by the tower house. The Douglases continued to hold the lands of Tantallon as tenants of Robert Stewart, Earl of Fife (c.1340-1420), from 1371 until 1372, when he resigned the title in favour of his son, Murdoch Stewart. Tantallon was the home of William Douglas' sister-in-law and mistress, Margaret Stewart, 3rd Countess of Angus, the mother of his illegitimate son, George Douglas (1380–1403). In 1377, the Earl of Angus made his close friend, Alan de Lawedre of The Bass, Constable of Tantallon Castle, an office he held until at least 1389. In 1388, when the 2nd Earl of Douglas died, the Earl of Fife claimed the lands of Tantallon, and confirmed the Countess' right to live there. Several attempts were made to dislodge the Countess, but an agreement was formalised by Parliament in April 1389, and George Douglas was recognised as Earl of Angus, being the heir of his mother.

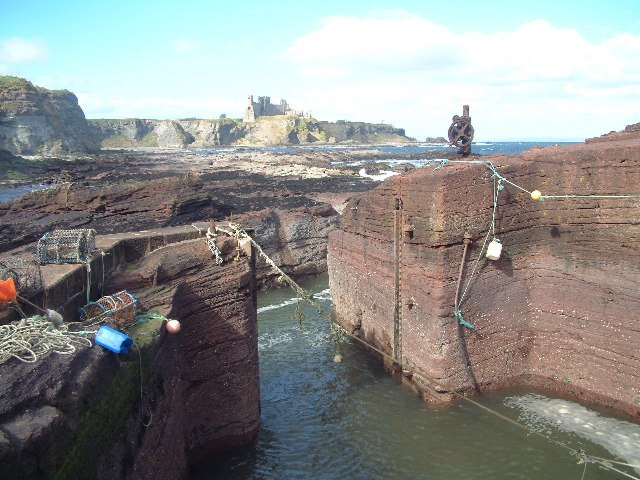
View from Seacliff Harbour, showing the fortifications blocking the promontory

=== The Red Douglases ===
The Barony of North Berwick, surrounding Tantallon, stayed with the Earldom of Fife, but despite the Earl's claim, the castle passed outright into the Douglas family and was inherited by George Douglas, illegitimate son of the Earl of Douglas, who also inherited his mother's Earldom of Angus in 1389. This was the start of the division in the House of Douglas. Archibald the Grim became head of the main line, known as the "Black Douglases". George Douglas was the progenitor of the "Red Douglases".

In 1397, George Douglas married Princess Mary Stewart, daughter of King Robert III of Scotland, allying the Red Douglases with the Royal House of Stewart. From 1425 to 1433, Isabella, Countess of Lennox, the widow of the executed Duke of Albany, was warded at Tantallon. In 1429, another royal enemy, Alexander, Lord of the Isles, was held at Tantallon until his reconciliation with King James I two years later. The 3rd Earl of Angus (1426–1446) made Tantallon his main residence, and was in rebellion from 1443 until his death. He raided the Black Douglas lands of Abercorn, leading to retaliation and his forfeiture in 1446, a few months before his death. In 1452, King James II granted Tantallon to the 4th Earl of Angus, brother of the 3rd Earl of Angus, who led the Royal force that defeated the Black Douglases at the Battle of Arkinholm in May 1455.

The Red Douglases, in the person of Archibald "Bell-the-Cat" (1453–1514), the 5th Earl, turned against the Royal house in 1482. Around 1490, Angus struck a treasonable agreement with Henry VII of England, against James IV of Scotland. On 11 October 1491, Tantallon Castle was besieged by James IV, with guns sent from Edinburgh and Linlithgow, and crossbows and culverins (a primitive type of handgun) from Leith. However, Angus submitted and the castle did not suffer extensive damage. By 1493 Angus was back in favour as Chancellor of Scotland. In 1498 the Constable of Tantallon Castle was Patrick Mathewson of Little Spot.

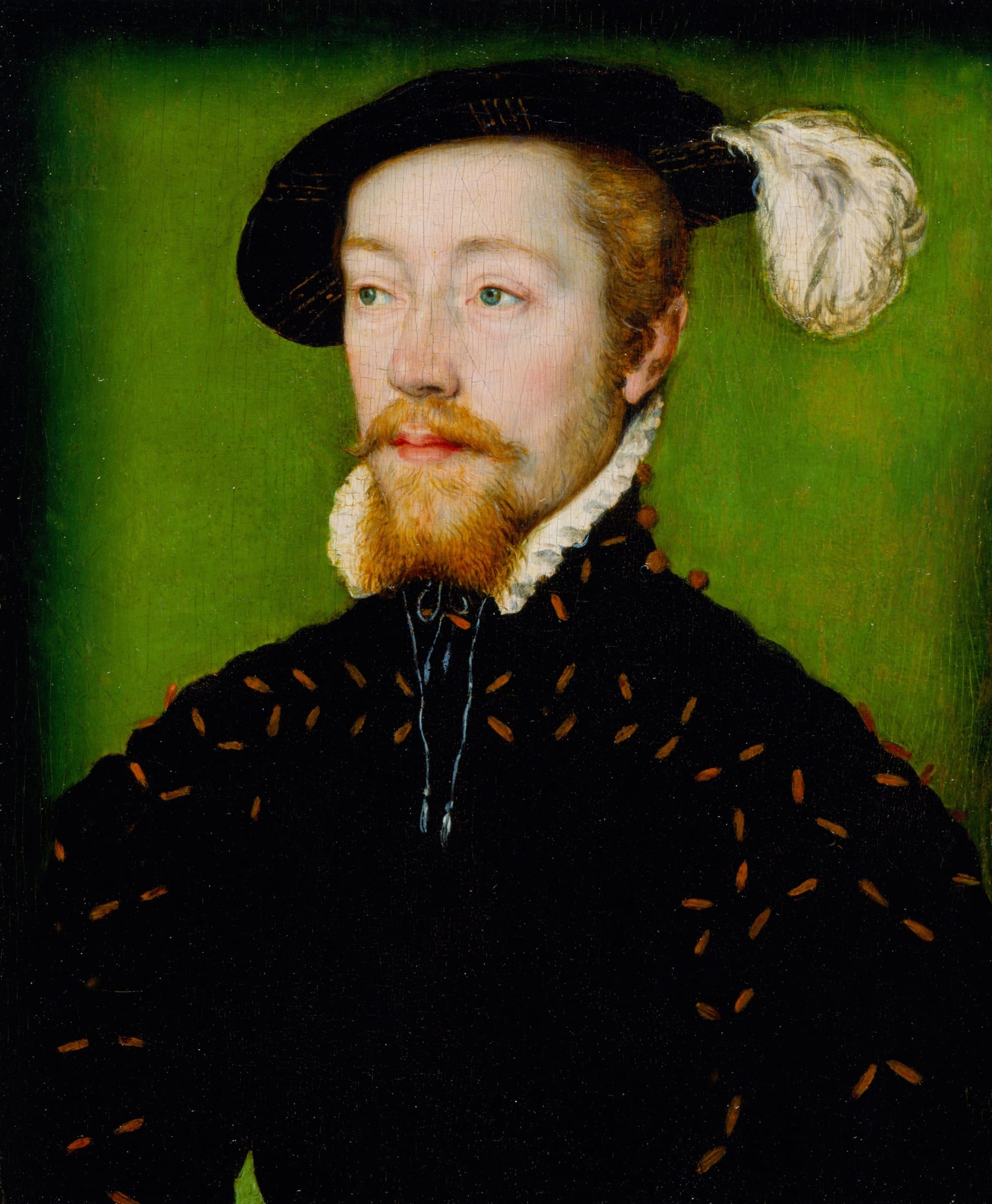
James V of Scotland, who successfully besieged Tantallon in 1528

=== The Siege of 1528 ===
In 1514, Archibald Douglas, 6th Earl of Angus (1490–1557) married James IV's widow Margaret Tudor, daughter of Henry VII, and Regent of Scotland for her infant son James V. The couple unsuccessfully conspired to take the young King to England, sparking off a civil war. The Regency was handed to John Stewart, Duke of Albany, who seized Tantallon in 1515, although it was returned when Angus made his peace. Margaret Tudor stopped at Tantallon during her journey to England in 1515. She left valuable costume and jewels behind at Tantallon, including several borders for hoods called "chaffrons" and a diamond that had been a present from Louis XII of France. The jewels were collected by Thomas Dacre's agent, the Master of College of Greystoke.

In 1525, Angus, with support from Henry VIII of England, staged a virtual coup d'état, taking custody of the young King, and becoming Chancellor. But, in 1528, the sixteen-year-old James V escaped, and, joining his mother at Stirling, pronounced Angus attainted, banishing him to "north of the Spey". Angus instead retreated to Tantallon, and then to England. The castle was seized by the King, but Angus managed to return and refortify his stronghold. On 23 October 1528, King James laid siege to Tantallon which was defended by Angus's servant Simon Penango. Angus himself remained at Billie in the Merse.

Alexander Jardine of Applegarth, the Master of Artillery, consulted with Robert Borthwick and John Drummond about the cannon and equipment required. James V borrowed the guns from Dunbar Castle which was held by the French garrison of the Duke of Albany. According to Pitscottie, the guns supplied by Captain Maurice of Dunbar were Thrawinmouth, Mow and her marrow (partner), two great botcards, two moyanes, two double falcons, four quarter falcons, with powder, gunners and bullets. James left three hostages with Maurice in pledge for the guns. The castle was bombarded with this cannon for 20 days, although the King's guns could not be brought close enough to the walls to do substantive damage, due to the deep outer ditch. The King lifted the siege and returned to Edinburgh, at which point Angus counterattacked and captured the King's artillery and his principal gunner David Falconer was killed.

Angus wrote to the Earl of Northumberland, that James V had brought Scottish and French engineers, "ingenious men", to the siege without success, "as can be rememberit, thar was nevir sa mekill (so much) pane travell expensis and diligence done and maid for the wynning of ane house, and the sammyn (same) escaip in Scotland, sen it was first inhabit." In May 1529, Angus fled to England, leaving the castle to James. Simon Penango, having received no further supplies or reinforcements from Angus made terms and surrendered the castle. Tantallon was retained as a Royal fortress until James V's death in 1542 when Angus returned and recovered it.

To repair damage sustained during the siege, the King set about rebuilding and strengthening the castle. First, Sir Thomas Erskine of Brechin, the king's secretary, was made the keeper and organised strengthening and repair works. He was at the castle in July 1533. Then the castle was given to the king's eldest illegitimate son James. Soon after, Oliver Sinclair was installed as captain, and the surviving accounts for the period 1537–1539 record that George Sempill was the master mason, carrying out the repairs under the direction of John Scrimgeour, the King's Master of Works. The front of the gatehouse was rebuilt, and the East Tower strengthened. Wide-mouthed gun holes were punched through the landward walls of the tower, and a crenellated parapet was added to the curtain wall. To strengthen the great landward curtain wall several chambers and passages within were filled with masonry, and can be seen today. Pitscottie described this operation: "the king caused masons come and ranforce the wallis, quhilkis war left waste before as transis (passages), and through-passages; and maid all massie work, to mak it the more strang."

=== The Rough Wooing ===
On Angus' return in 1542, he was still in contact with Henry VIII, and allowed Sir Ralph Sadler, English ambassador to Scotland, to reside at Tantallon during the attempts to negotiate a marriage between the infant Mary, Queen of Scots, and Edward, Prince of Wales in 1542–43. It has been claimed that when the Earl of Hertford invaded Scotland in 1544, during the ensuing War of the Rough Wooing, Tantallon was bypassed by the English army, due to the Earl's English sympathies. However, Hertford was keen to put an English garrison in Tantallon and negotiated unsuccessfully with one of the keepers, Alexander Jardine. The nearby castle of Oliver Sinclair was amongst places burnt by the returning English army in May 1544. Tantallon was also unmolested in 1547. Angus was finally imprisoned at Blackness Castle in 1544, after which he changed sides to support the Scottish cause. The gunners of Tantallon were rewarded in August 1548, after firing on English ships during an engagement in the Firth of Forth.

=== Later 16th century ===
Angus died at Tantallon in January 1557, and the castle was seized by the army of Queen Regent, Mary of Guise. Simon Preston, Laird of Craigmillar was made keeper, and repairs were carried out the following year. Six labourers called "barrowmen" spent 10 days in April 1558 cleaning out the well. George Drummond of Blair was keeper of Tantallon, with a garrison of seven horsemen and 22 soldiers.

James Douglas, 4th Earl of Morton took control in 1565, on behalf of his nephew, the young 8th Earl of Angus, but the following year, Mary, Queen of Scots, gave the Captaincy to Robert Lauder of the Bass, and his son, Robert Lauder, younger of the Bass The appointment of the Lauders followed the surrender of Sir William Douglas of Lochleven, who was one of those charged with the murder of Queen Mary's favourite, David Rizzio, in March 1566. Mary visited Tantallon herself in November 1566.

Andrew Hume was Captain of Tantallon Castle in 1577. The 8th Earl of Angus was sent into exile in England in 1581, and left some of best furnishings from Tantallon with Lord Hunsdon at Berwick-upon-Tweed, including a bed of green velvet and damask, a bed of crimson velvet "fair embroidered with images and beasts of gold", and a bed of cloth of silver and cloth of gold. He had a brewhouse in the castle repaired in September 1583. In April 1584 the keepers of Fast Castle, Innerwick, and Tantallon were commanded to surrender their castles to the crown.

Following the death of the 8th Earl in 1588, the Earls of Angus usually lived elsewhere and had little to do with Tantallon Castle. In February 1592 an inventory was made of the furnishings and armaments. In July James VI took possession of the castle and Alexander Home of North Berwick was installed as captain. In September 1596 the captain of Tantallon, Stephen Bruntfield, was killed by James Carmichael, a son of Sir John Carmichael, Captain of the Royal Guard. Bruntsfield's brother Adam subsequently killed Carmichael in single combat. William Douglas, 10th Earl of Angus took up residence in the castle on 5 November 1608.

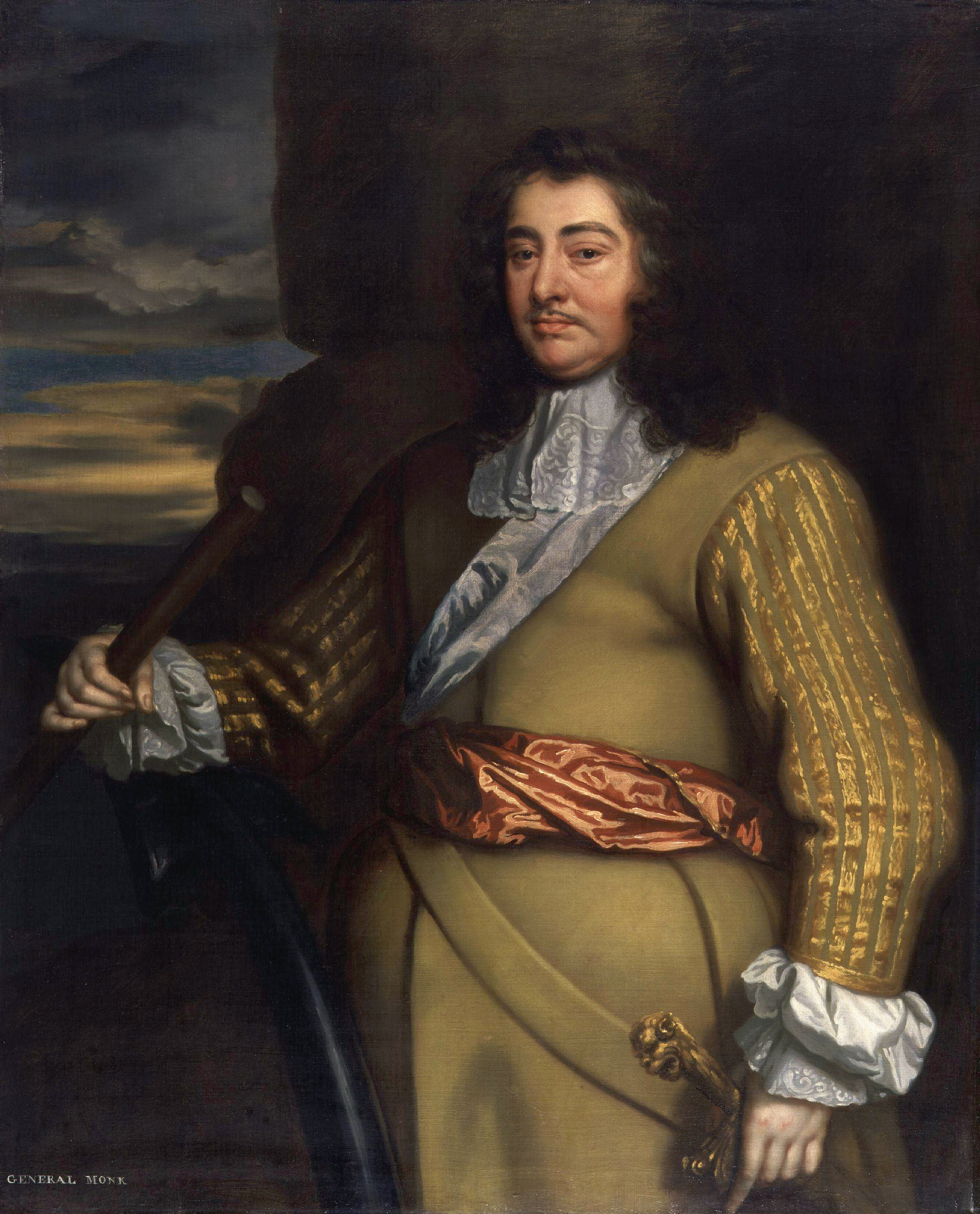
General Monck, who successfully besieged Tantallon in 1651

=== 17th century ===
After a period of peace, Tantallon again saw military action during the Bishops' Wars in 1639. The Douglas family had remained Catholic after the Scottish Reformation, incurring the wrath of the Presbyterian Covenanters, who opposed Charles I's attempts to interfere with the Scottish Church. In 1639, the Covenanters captured Tantallon while William, newly created Marquess of Douglas, was in Edinburgh.

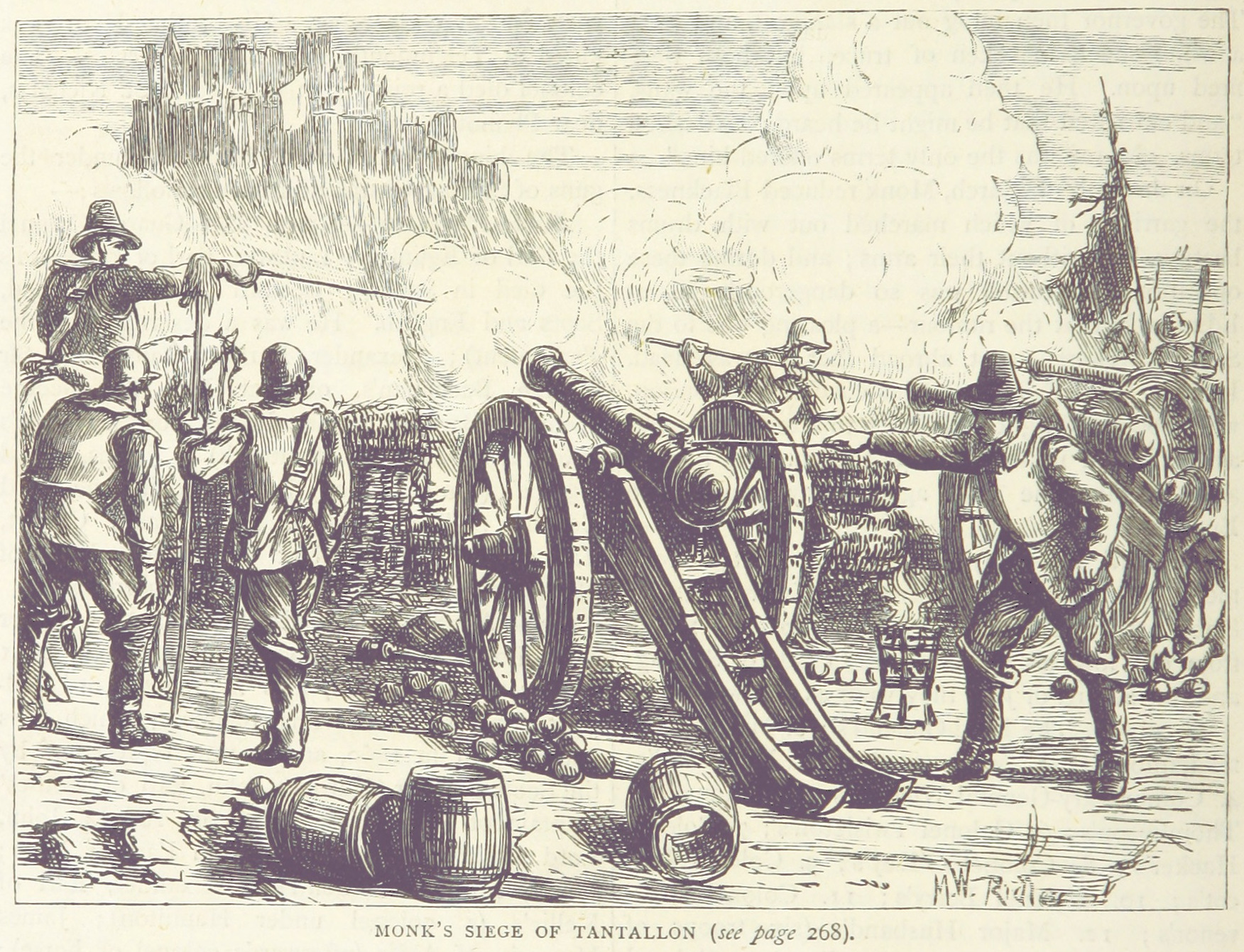
1651 siege

In 1650, during the Third English Civil War, Oliver Cromwell's Parliamentarian forces invaded Scotland, taking control of the south of the country after their victory at Dunbar in September. In February 1651, Cromwell found his lines of communication under attack from a small group of Royalists based at Tantallon. This group, led by Alexander Seton, comprised just 91 men. Despite this, Cromwell's retaliation was to send 2,000 to 3,000 troops under General Monck, together with much of the artillery he had in Scotland, and lay siege to Tantallon. Seton was ennobled by Charles II, as Viscount of Kingston, on 14 February, during the siege. After twelve days of bombardment with cannon a breach was made in the Douglas Tower. The defenders were compelled to surrender, but only after quarter had been granted to them in recognition of their bravery. After the siege Tantallon was left in ruins: it was never repaired or inhabited afterwards. The siege of Tantallon was also interesting in that the Commonwealth land forces were supported by the Commonwealth Navy.

Also in 1651 is one of the few recorded uses of the dungeon, when the Captain of the Bass Rock captured an English ship carrying provisions heading to the English army to the west: a cargo including 6000 pairs of boots, 5000 saddles and 10 tons of London beer. The captured crew were imprisoned at Tantallon.

=== Later history ===
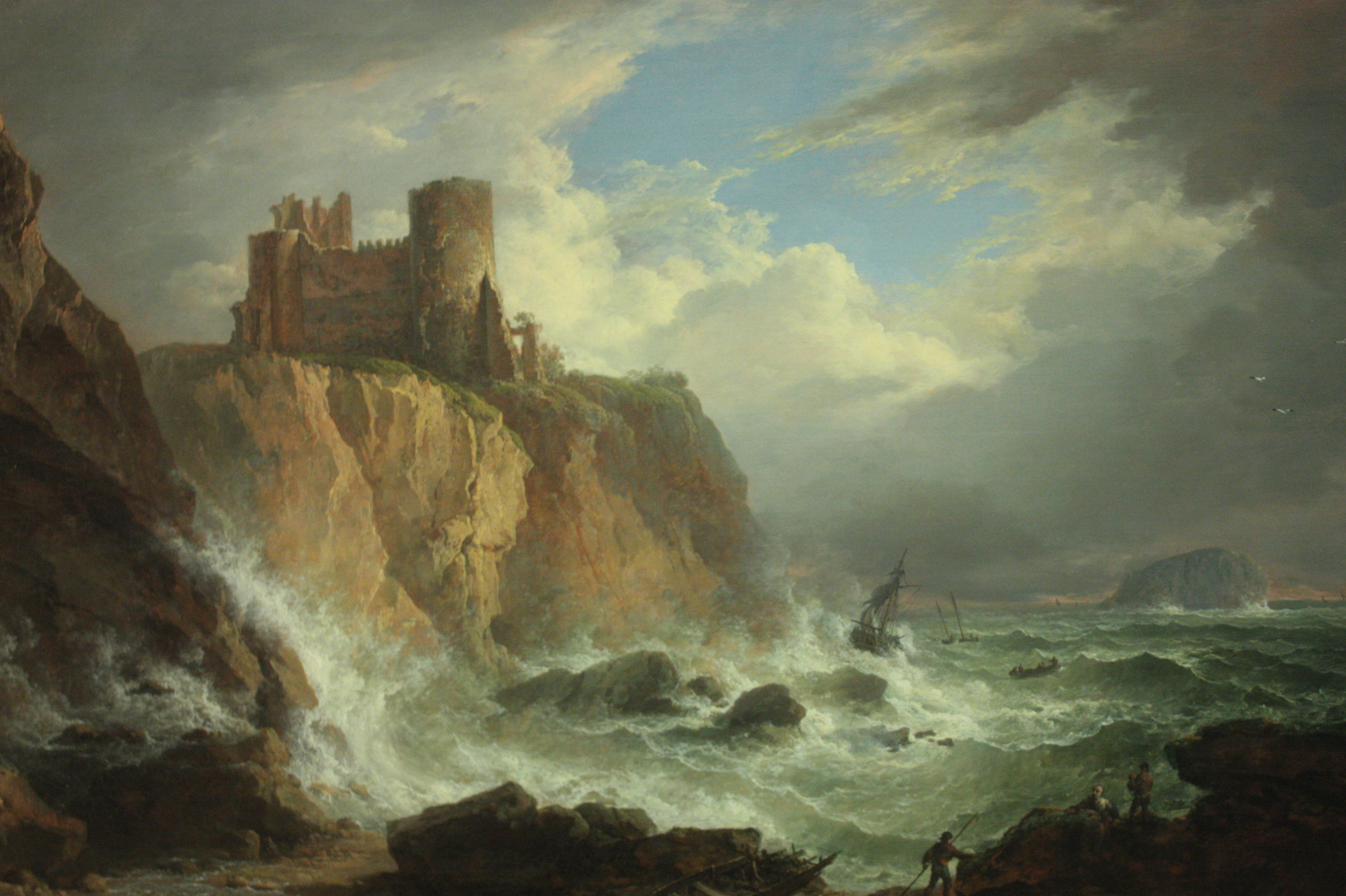
View of Tantallon Castle and the Bass Rock by Alexander Nasmyth, 18th–19th century

James Douglas, 2nd Marquess of Douglas, the 12th Earl of Angus, was forced, due to gambling debts accrued by himself and his father, to consolidate his estates. The ruins of Tantallon were sold, in 1699, to Sir Hew Dalrymple, the President of the Court of Session, who also owned the Barony of North Berwick, the Bass, Fidra and other properties in the area. Dalrymple allowed the castle to decay further, and to be quarried to a certain extent for stone. Sir Walter Scott described the castle at length in his 1808 epic poem Marmion. Some restoration was carried out by the Dalrymples in the late 19th century, and in 1924, the castle was handed over to the UK Government's Office of Works by Dalrymple's descendant, Sir Hew Hamilton-Dalrymple, Bt.

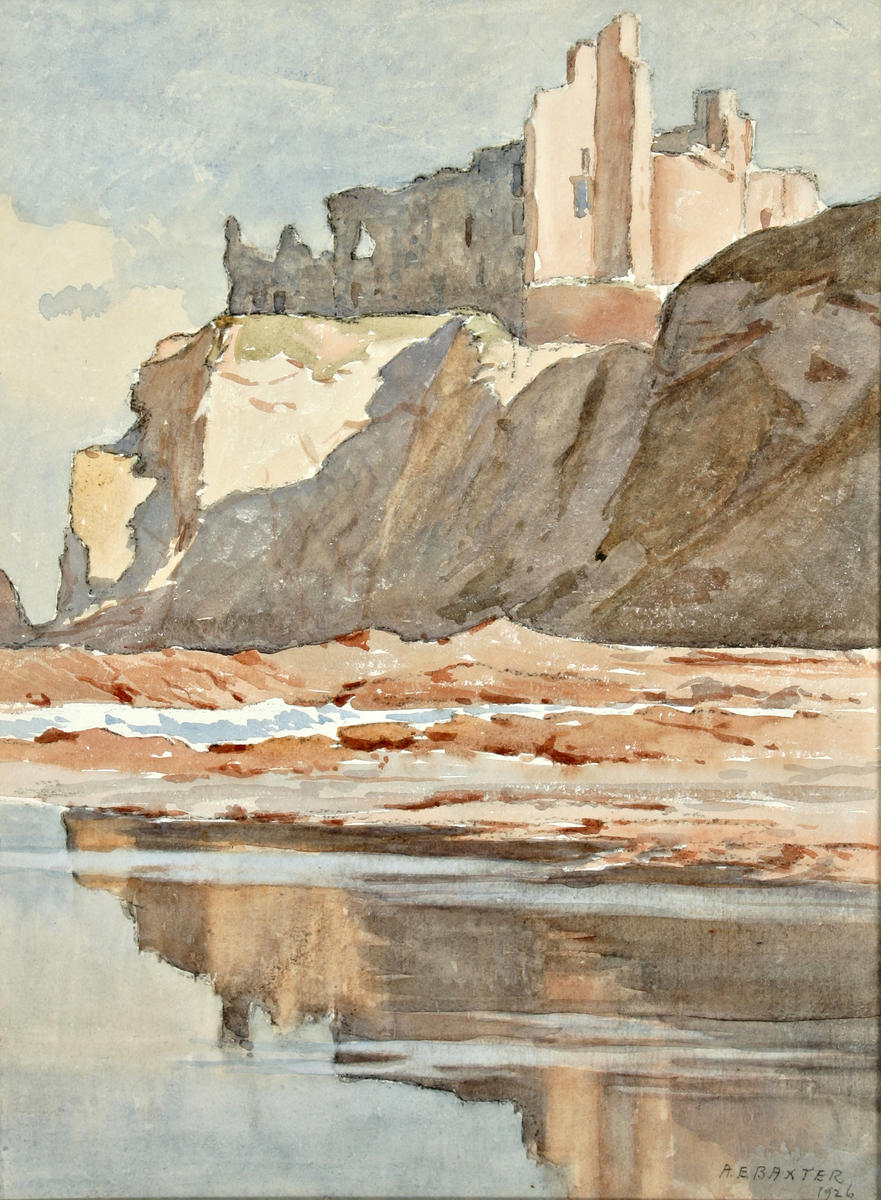
Tantallon Castle painted by Alfred Baxter in 1926

In 1944, the Castle also played a role in preparations for the Normandy invasion. A few weeks before D-Day, captured German Würzburg, Freya, and Seetakt radars (types used by the Germans defending the French coast), were moved to the Castle. There, they were used in the training of RAF bomber crews (including 617 Squadron, the famous "Dambusters") who were part of a massive effort to deceive the Germans as to the actual location of the Allied invasion. Beginning on the night before the D-day landings, thin strips of aluminium foil were to be dropped by the bombers near two locations far from Normandy. The strips were to be dropped in vast numbers, in carefully choreographed patterns, over many hours. It was hoped the bombers would thus be able to create on German radar an illusion of huge approaching naval fleets, even though the "fleets" were non-existent. The technique, perfected in the waters off Tantallon Castle, was carried out on the night of June 5–6 by the bomber crews in the waters off the coast of France.

The Castle is now in the care of Historic Environment Scotland as a Scheduled Ancient Monument.

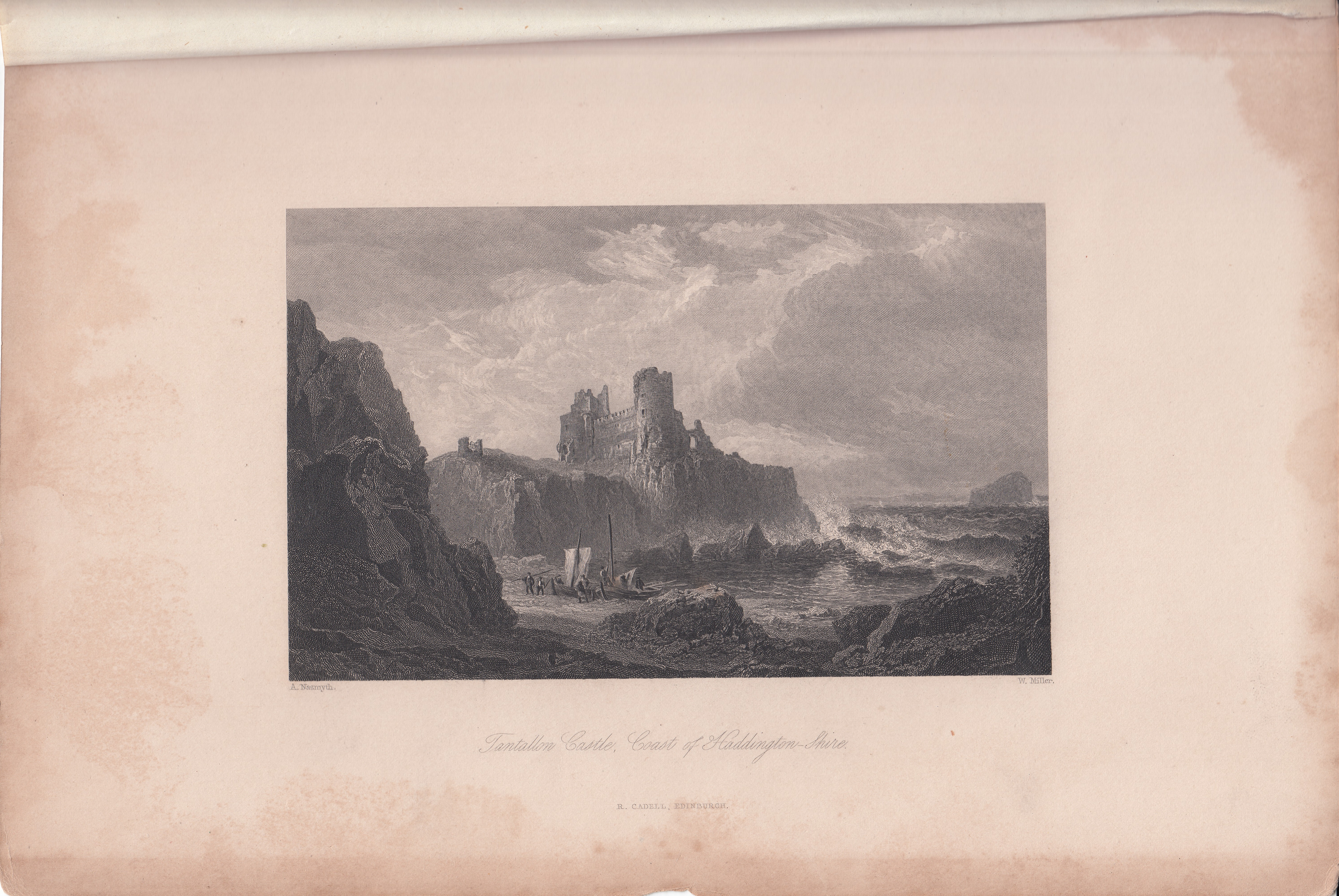
Tantallon Castle & Coast from Waverley Novels IV, 1844.

== In popular culture ==
The ruins of Tantallon Castle are featured in the 2013 thriller Under the Skin from British director Jonathan Glazer. Actors Scarlett Johansson and Michael Moreland are depicted on the roof, then cautiously descending the narrow inside staircase. Said the film's location manager Eugene Strange, "We always felt the castle had to be coastal, because we wanted them to be buffeted on the ramparts up there...and it felt quite overwhelming for her...It was epic when we found it. The views from there!"

In the fourteenth episodes of Series 11 and 12 of Raven as well episodes 2 and 3 of the Gaelic miniseries "Fitheach", it served as the location for the challenges "Warrior's Wall" and "Stones of Destiny".

== Ghostlore ==
In modern times the castle and its surroundings are the subject of several ghostlore stories.
