= Jewels of James III of Scotland =

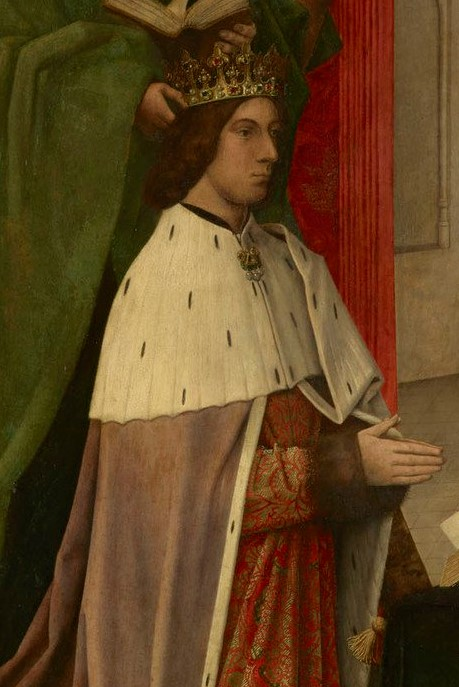
James III of Scotland, detail from the Trinity Altarpiece

Some of the jewels belonging to James III of Scotland and his late consort Margaret of Denmark were described in an inventory made after his death at the battle of Sauchieburn in 1488. The inventory was published in 1815 by Thomas Thomson and in 1877 by Thomas Dickson.

== Jewels in Edinburgh Castle ==
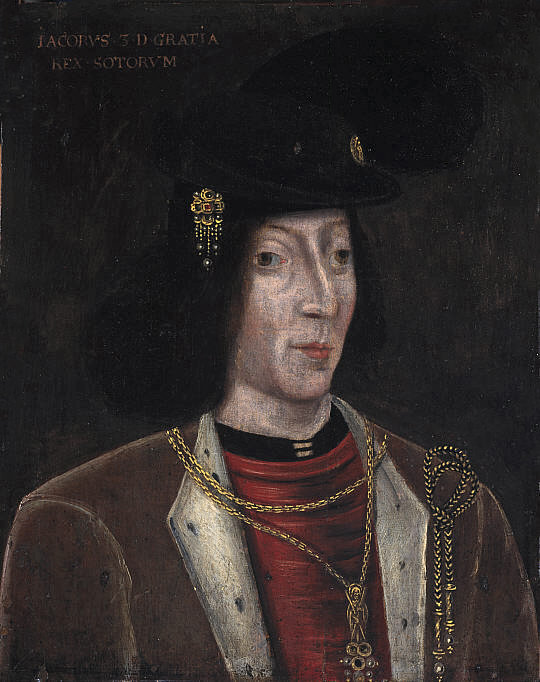
16th or 17th-century portrait of James III with a Saint Andrew pendant.

Six days after the battle of Sauchieburn, an inventory of jewels was made at Edinburgh Castle on 17 June 1488, listing the contents of the late king's "black kist", which contained three smaller coffers, a box, and another small chest described as a "cageat". A blacksmith was employed to force the locks. The chests contained a quantity of rose nobles, Henry nobles, angels, and other gold coins. Some coins were in a painted coffer and a canvas purse (a "poik") within the black kist. The blacksmith was caught absconding with 40 gold coins and some English groats. More caches of gold coin were recovered from the late king's allies and a box found in a "myre" near the battlefield. James III had taken the sword of Robert the Bruce to Sauchieburn, and this was recovered by Walter Simson and returned to Edinburgh.

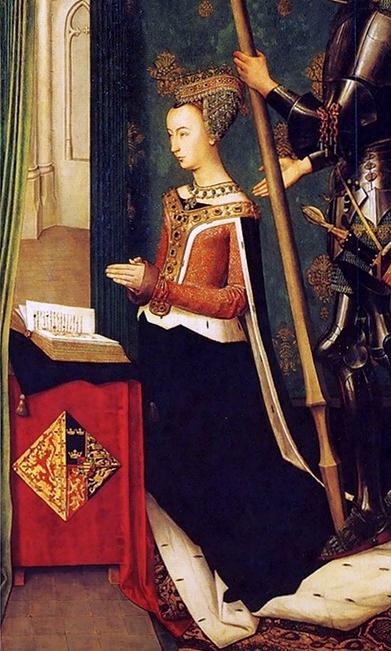
Margaret of Denmark, Queen of Scotland, Hugo van der Goes

A box found in the black kist contained a string of 122 gold beads and a pendant knop, a gold book or table with a clasp set with pearls and a ruby, "the great diamond", and a "stomak" with a heart of precious stones and pearls. These items may have belonged to Margaret of Denmark. Another wooden box contained a large clothing fastener, a "point" set with 25 pearls and gold "horn" fasteners. There were gold toothpicks and an earpick, a perfumed "must ball" or pomander, and a heart of gold. A round box or "buist" contained a gold cross set with four stones, a gold collar, and two glasses of precious balm. There was a brooch or "uche" shaped like a fleur de lys, and other pieces.

The chest called a "cageat" contained a ball of crystal, possibly used for divination, and a purse embroidered with pearls. This purse contained another "moist ball" pomander, and a "serpent tongue", a fossil tooth believed to act as a safeguard against poison. Another little coffer contained a larger serpent's tongue, and two more serpents tongues. There were rings kept on rolls of parchment. The contents of a small coffer included the collars or emblems of the Order of Saint Michael and the Order of the Elephant.

A black coffer obtained from the Abbot of Arbroath contained French gold coins, a collar of the Order of Saint Michael with 24 gold cockle shells, and a collar of gold wheatsheaves alternating with feathers, described as "the great sarpe of gold contenand xxv schaiffis with the fedder betuix". Another blacksmith was paid three shillings to mend the locks of the boxes returned by the Abbot.

A large chest in Edinburgh Castle, banded with iron, contained silver plate and four mazer cups said to have belonged to Robert the Bruce. The inventory mentions that some relics were kept in a closet in David's Tower in Edinburgh Castle, including a flask of Holy Water and a shirt of Robert the Bruce.

The surviving treasurer's accounts of the reign of James III mention the making of a new gold livery collar in 1473 to replace one given by James to a Danish knight. James gave a collar to Anselm Adornes which may have resembled the collar depicted on his tomb effigy and in stained glass at the Bruges Jeruzalemkapel with "I.3" motifs and a pendant unicorn.

=== Goldsmiths in the royal accounts ===
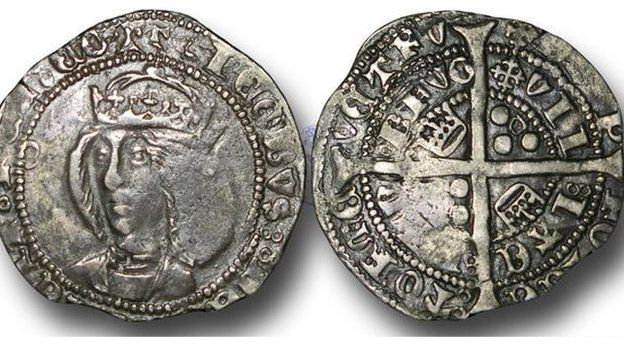
A silver groat of James III.

Henry VII of England imported some jewels from France and Flanders, and James III may have made similar purchases. Among the goldsmiths mentioned in the Scottish royal accounts William the Goldsmith had worked for James II and was paid in 1464 for a silver collar presented to the master gunner Dedric Grutare. Gilbert Fish, like William, was also a moneyer and coined Scottish groats at Berwick-upon-Tweed before the town was captured by the English in 1482. Gilbert Fish subsequently worked for James IV, and was given gold coins for gilding silver plate in November 1488. Other Scottish goldsmiths of the period include Matthew Auchinleck and John Currour, who was also named as a moneyer with Fish in 1493 and acquired a hoard of silver found in Banff in 1494.

== Margaret of Denmark's treasures ==
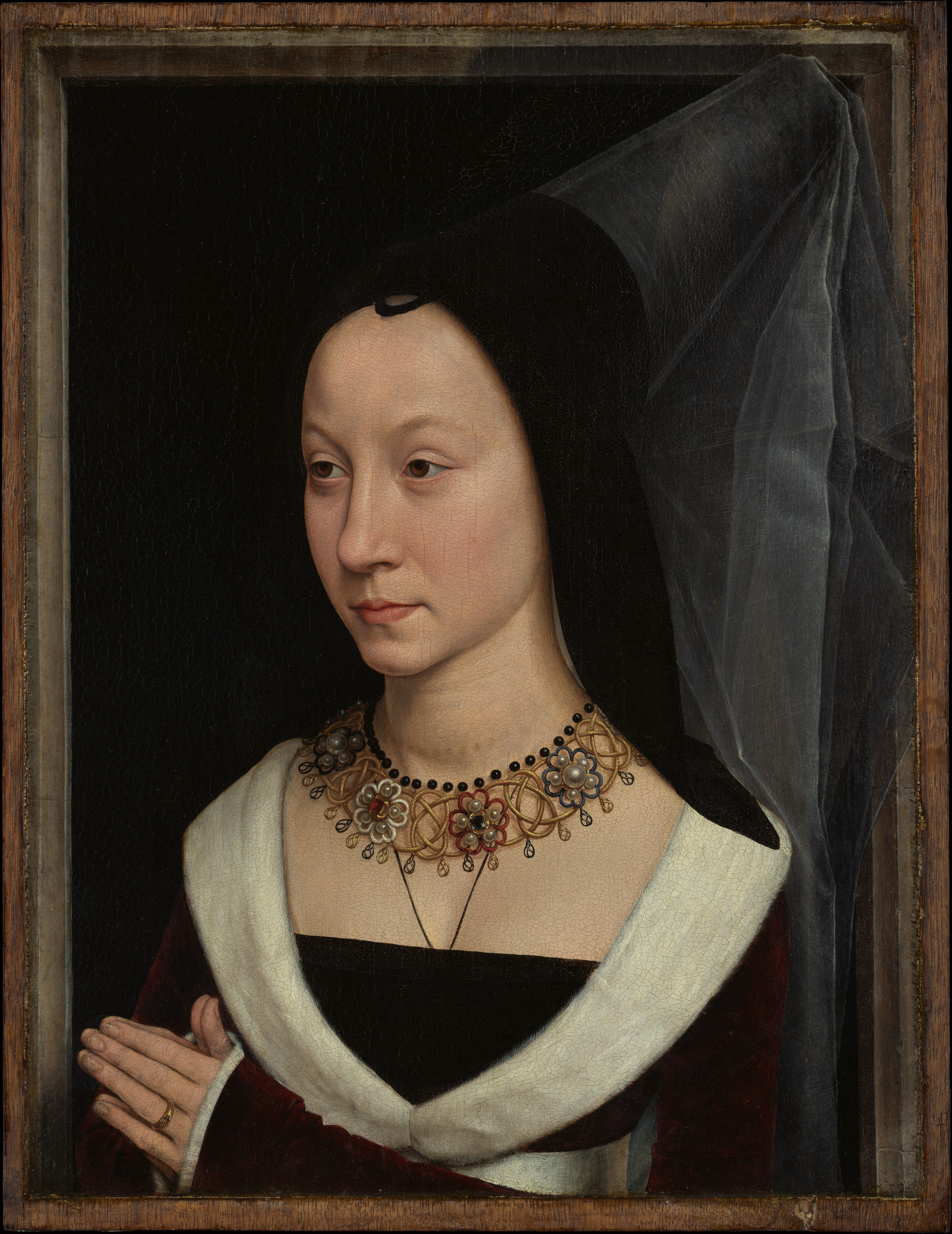
Portrait of Maria Portinari, Hans Memling

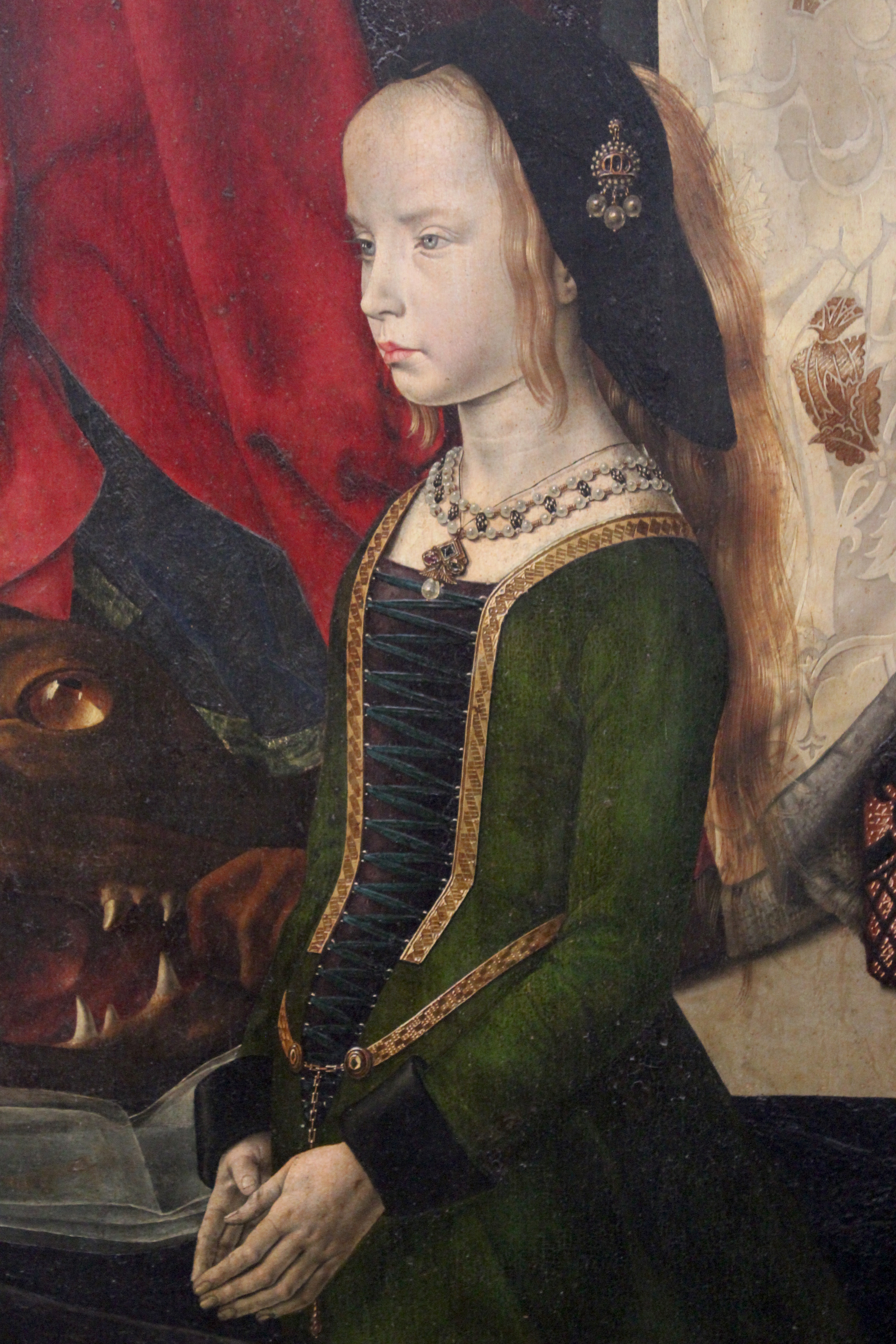
Marguerite Portinari, from the Portinari Altarpiece

The same inventory includes the contents of a chest brought from Stirling Castle containing treasures that had belonged to Margaret of Denmark (died 1486). She owned a gold chain or necklace made of interwoven looping "friar's knots", and a collar of gold roses, enamelled. For the art historian Ronald Lightbown, the rose collar mentioned in the inventory evokes the rose collar depicted in Hans Memling's portrait of Maria Portinari.

Two great edges of gold set with large pearls and rubies or diamonds were perhaps head-dresses worn on a hood, or may have been worn on a gown. A pearl "fret" was worn as a hairnet, a "frete of the Quenis ovre set with grete perle sett in fouris and fouris" possibly resembling her caul depicted in the Trinity Altarpiece. However, Margaret of Denmark's necklace shown in the Trinity Altarpiece is similar to that worn by Marguerite Portinari in the Portinari Altarpiece, which was painted in the same years, and may be evidence of the choices of the painter Hugo van der Goes and his patrons rather than a reflection of jewels in the Scottish royal collection, while in both pictures playing on the name "Marguerite" or "Margaret" as a word for pearl.

The contents of the queen's chest included belts of cloth of gold and crimson fabric with gold fittings. There were rosaries and gold chains, a collar of chalcedony with a pendant including a container of musk perfume, and a small bag with nine unset precious stones. Margaret owned another serpent's tongue (a fossilized shark's tooth thought to guard against poison) and a piece of a unicorn horn set in gold, probably used to assay food at meals. A ring set with a "paddock stone", a toadstone, was also valued as an antidote to poison.

A collar "made like swans set in gold" with rubies and diamonds was possibly a token of the Order of the Swan founded by Margaret's uncle Frederick II, Elector of Brandenburg. In England, Margaret of Anjou, queen consort of Henry VI, was said to have distributed livery of swans (a Lancastrian badge) to potential supporters during the Wars of the Roses.

Margaret owned a pendant fashioned as her initial "M" set in diamonds with a great pearl. Her silk bed with purple curtains and a quilt embroidered with thistles and unicorns was packed in a trunk with a packet of lavender. There was a book of gold leaf for gilding.

== See also ==
- Jewels of Margaret Tudor
- Jewels of James V
- Jewels of Mary, Queen of Scots
