= Margaret of Denmark, Queen of Scotland =

Queen of Scots from 1469 to 1486

Margaret of Denmark
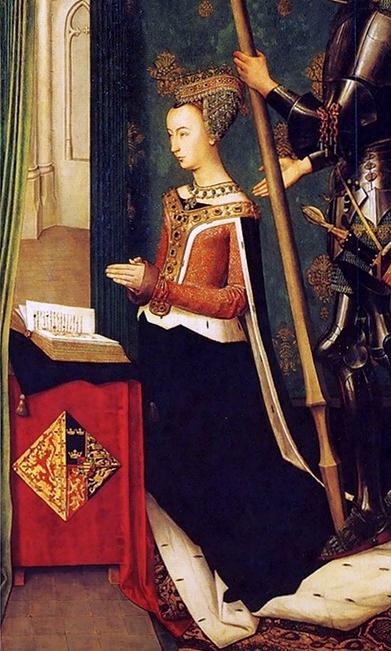
- Margaret depicted in the Trinity Altarpiece by Hugo van der Goes, c. 1480

Queen consort of Scots
- Tenure: July 1469 – 14 July 1486
- Born: 23 June 1456; Copenhagen Castle, Copenhagen, Denmark
- Died: 14 July 1486 (aged 30); Stirling Castle, Stirling, Scotland
- Burial: Cambuskenneth Abbey
- Spouse: James III of Scotland (m. 1469)
- Issue: James IV of Scotland; James, Duke of Ross; John, Earl of Mar
- House: Oldenburg
- Father: Christian I of Denmark
- Mother: Dorothea of Brandenburg

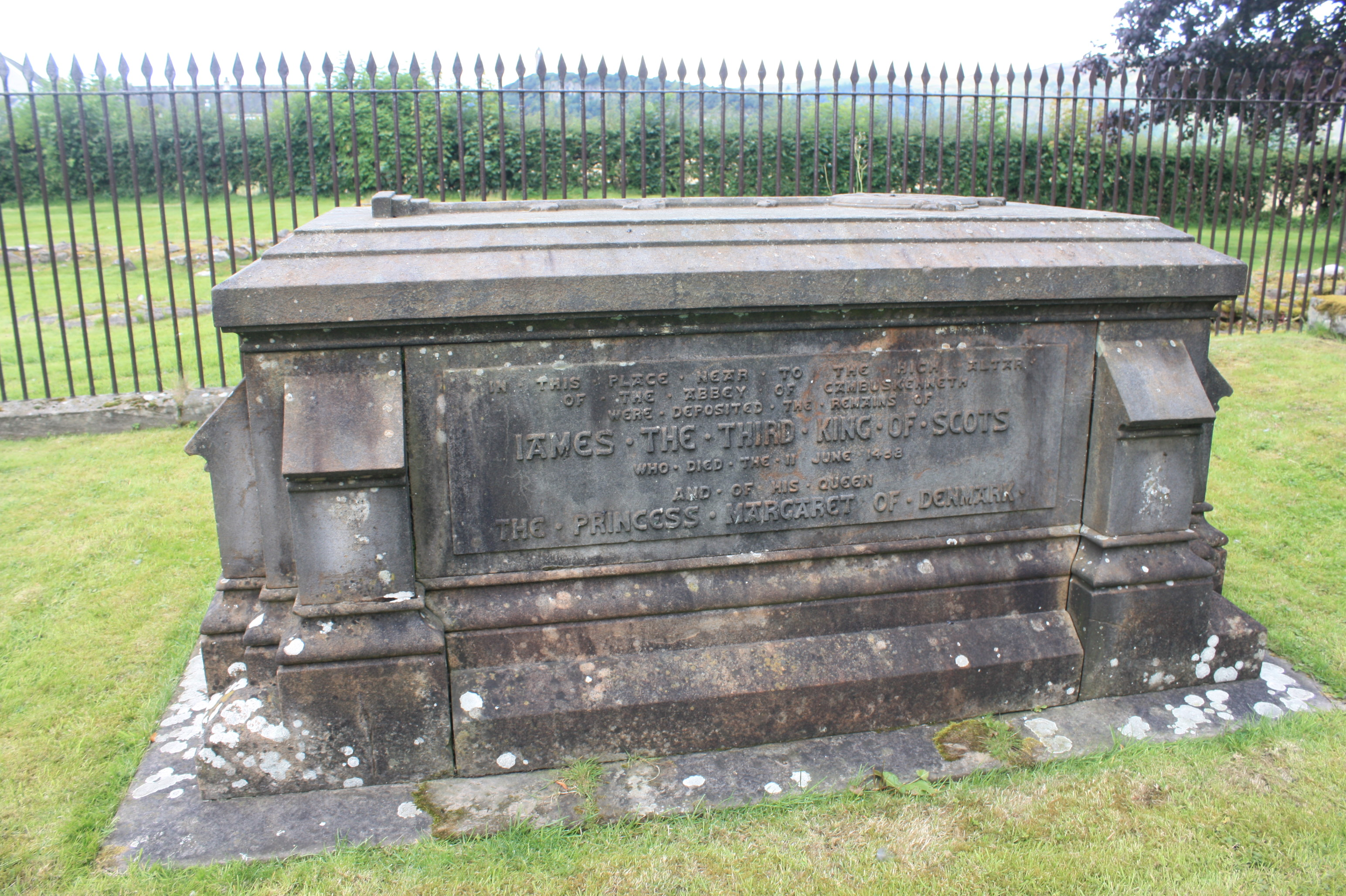
Modern grave of Queen Margaret at Cambuskenneth Abbey

Margaret of Denmark (Margrete in Danish; 23 June 1456 – 14 July 1486) was Queen of Scots from 1469 to 1486 by marriage to King James III. She was the daughter of Christian I, King of Denmark, Norway and Sweden, and Dorothea of Brandenburg.

== Life ==
Margaret was born in Denmark to King Christian I and Queen Dorothea of Denmark, Norway and Sweden. Not much is known about her upbringing. By the time she was four years old there were talks about her marriage to the Scottish Prince James. In 1468 Margaret was betrothed to James of Scotland as a means to stop a feud regarding the debt Scotland owed Denmark over the taxation of the Hebrides and Isle of Man. The marriage was arranged on the recommendation of King Charles VII of France. In July 1469, at the age of 13 she married James III at Holyrood Abbey. Upon their marriage all of the Scottish debt was cancelled. William Sinclair, 1st Earl of Caithness, was at that time the Norse Earl of Orkney. In 1472 he was made to exchange his Orkney fief for Ravenscraig Castle, so the Scottish throne took the earl's rights to the islands too.

Arms of Margaret as queen of Scotland

Queen Margaret was given the largest jointure allowed by Scottish law in her marriage settlement – one third of the royal revenues, together with Linlithgow Palace and Doune Castle. She was interested in clothes and jewellery, and known for always being dressed in the latest fashions of the time. Following the birth of her son James, in 1473 she went on a pilgrimage to Whithorn and then rejoined the king at Falkland Palace. She may have taught her son James to speak Danish. She became a popular queen in Scotland and was described as beautiful, gentle, and sensible.

The relationship between Margaret and James III was not described as a happy one. Reportedly, she was not very fond of her husband and had sexual intercourse with him only for procreation, though she did respect his position as a monarch. One reason for their estrangement was that James favoured their second son over their eldest. In 1476, James had decided that he wanted the Earldom of Ross for his second son and accused John MacDonald, the Earl, of treason. MacDonald was then put on trial before the Parliament, but upon Margaret's request he was allowed to remain as Lord of Parliament. During the crisis of 1482, when James III was deprived of power by his brother for several months, Margaret was said to have shown more interest in the welfare of her children than her spouse, which led to a permanent estrangement. Politically, she worked for the reinstatement of her spouse in his powers as monarch during this incident. After the crisis of 1482, the couple lived apart: James III lived in Edinburgh, while queen Margaret preferred to live in Stirling with her children.

== Death ==
Margaret died at Stirling Castle on 14 July 1486 after falling ill, and was buried in Cambuskenneth Abbey. Her husband, James III, was interred with her after his death in 1488. The abbey has mostly been reduced to ruins, apart from its bell-tower, which is still standing today. The grave was enclosed and restored in 1865 at the expense of their descendant, Queen Victoria.

A story told by her son claims that Margaret was killed by poison given to her by John Ramsay, 1st Lord Bothwell, leader of one of the political factions. As he was still favoured by the royal family after her death, this is doubtful and maybe slanderous, although he did know poisons.

== Jewels and costume ==
Records of costume and fabric bought for Margaret of Denmark survive in the accounts of the Lord Treasurers of Scotland. Fabrics and fur were bought by her chamber and wardrobe servants, Andrew Balfour, Caldwell, and Sandris Wardrop (Sanders of the Wardrobe), from merchants and shopkeepers in Edinburgh including Isobel Williamson, Thomas Yare, and Sandy Turing. Shoes were made by Hud, described as a "souter". A skinner in Stirling made leather gloves. Garments made in 1473 and 1474 include gowns of blue velvet and red satin, cloaks, a kirtle of green damask, a riding gown, "stomaks" made of satin lined with ermine, "bonnets of tire", "turrets" (veils), tippets and collars of velvet trimmed with fur. Gowns were also bought for the six gentlewomen of her chamber. An Edinburgh merchant, Andrew Moubray, provided cloths used to line her bath tub.

An inventory of a chest or "kist" and a coffer called a "gardeviant" from Stirling Castle containing some of the jewels of Margaret of Denmark and James III was made in 1488 following the Battle of Sauchieburn. The contents included belts of cloth of gold and crimson fabric with gold fittings. There were rosaries and gold chains, a collar of chalcedony with a pendant including a container of musk perfume, a pearl "fret" (a hair net), a swan collar, a small bag with nine unset precious stones, and a bag of lavender. There was a serpent tongue (a fossilized shark's tooth thought to be a safeguard against poison) and a piece of a unicorn horn set in gold, probably used to assay food at meals. She also owned a ring set with a "paddock stone", a toadstone also valued as an antidote to poison. There was a book of gold leaf for gilding, and purple bed curtains and a quilt embroidered with thistles and unicorns. She had a pendant fashioned as her initial "M" set in diamonds with a great pearl.

== Issue ==
- James IV (17 March 1473 – 9 September 1513)
- James Stewart, Duke of Ross (March 1476 – January 1504)
- John Stewart, Earl of Mar (December 1479 – 1503).

== Gallery ==
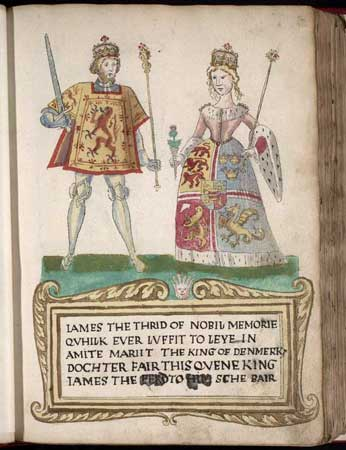
King James III and Queen Margaret on the 1562 Forman Armorial

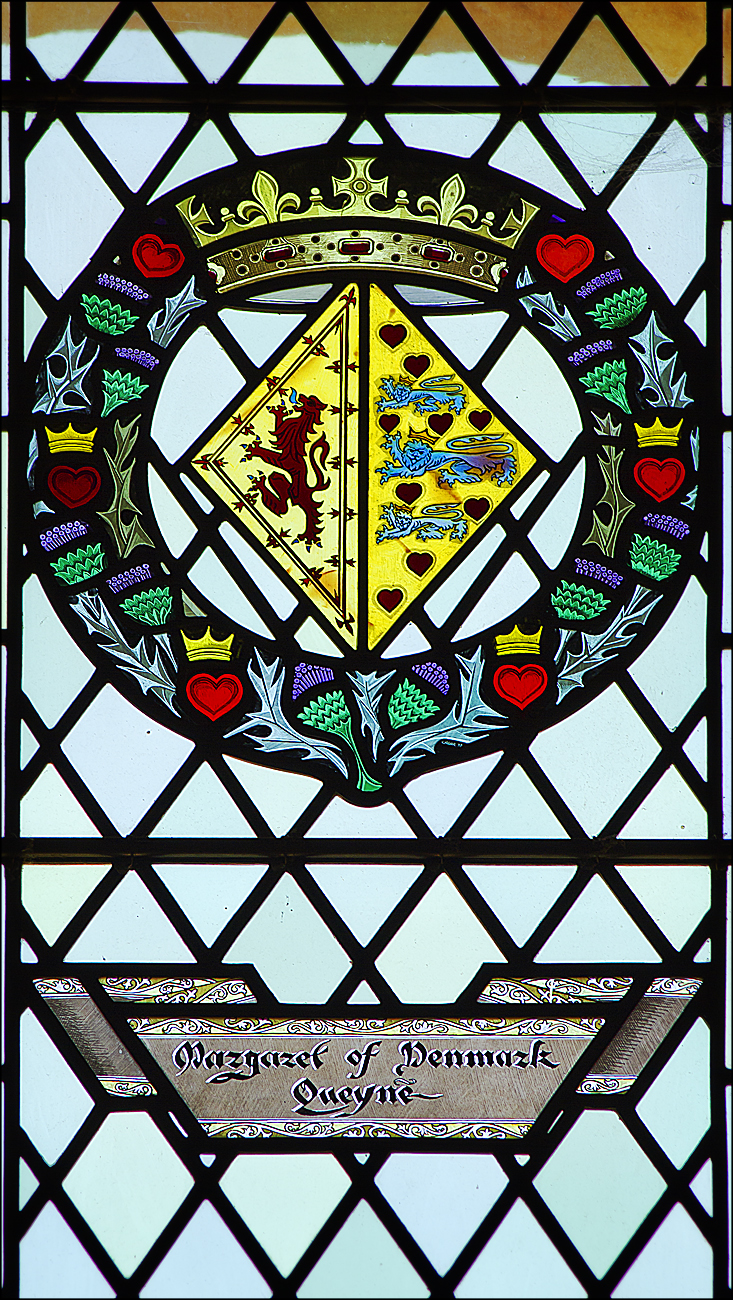
Stained Glass Window, Great Hall, Stirling Castle. The Great Hall was built by Queen Margaret's son King James IV.

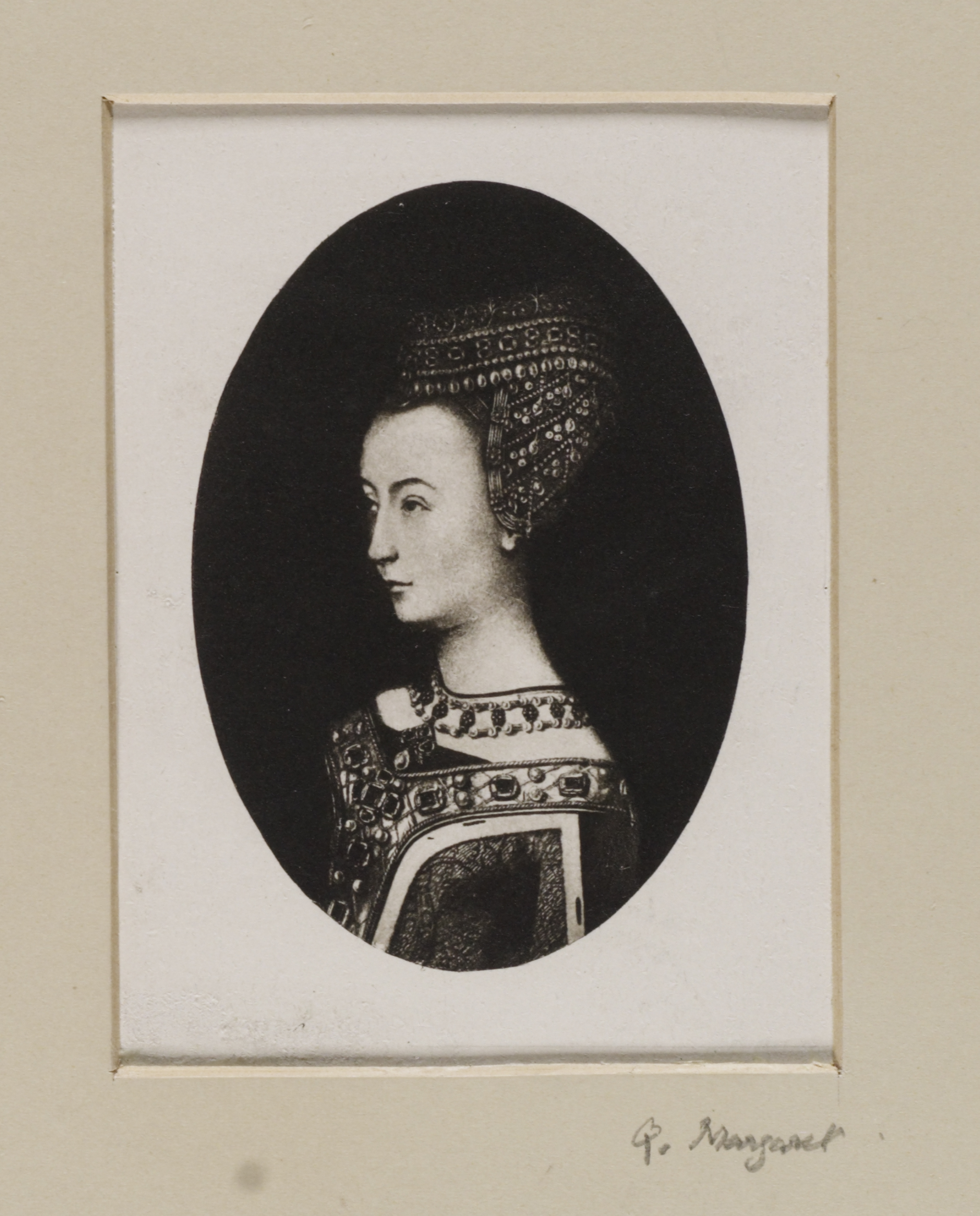
Later depiction of Queen Margaret from a Jacobite broadside, based on the portrait by Hugo van der Goes.

Scottish royalty
Vacant Title last held by Mary of Guelders	Queen consort of Scotland; 1469–1486	Vacant Title next held by Margaret Tudor
