= Jewels of Margaret Tudor =

Jewels belonging to Margaret Tudor

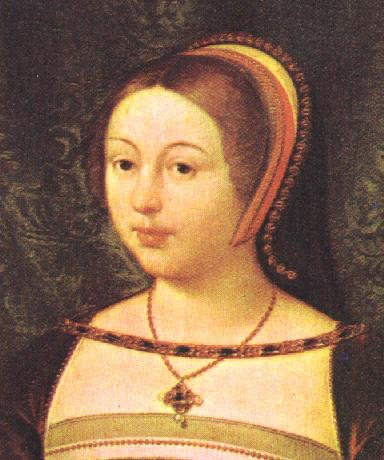
Margaret Tudor, Daniël Mijtens, Royal Collection

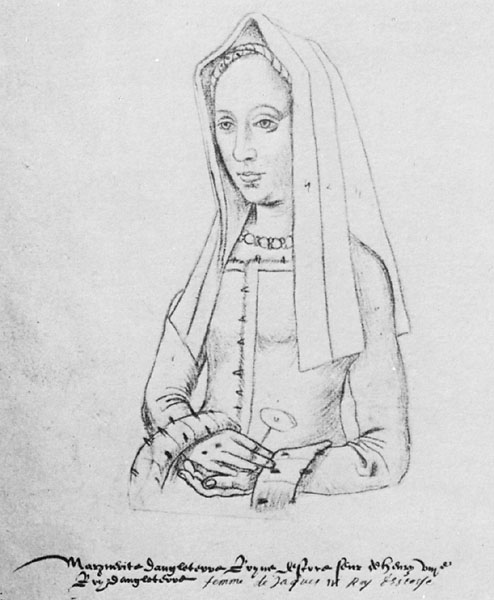
Drawing of Margaret Tudor from the 16th-century Recueil d'Arras

Several documents list the jewels of Margaret Tudor, daughter of Henry VII of England and Elizabeth of York. Margaret married James IV of Scotland in 1503.

== Queen of Scots ==
The magnificent jewels and costume worn by Margaret Tudor on her journey to Scotland and reception at Holyrood Palace were described in general terms by the English herald John Young. She attended mass at York Cathedral dressed in cloth of gold with a collar of precious stones and a girdle of fine gold with a chain descending to the ground.

There are accounts in English and Latin for making her costume and furnishings, including beds sent with her to Scotland which featured her heraldry embroidered by William Mowse, and gowns for her gentlewomen, including Elizabeth Berlay. There are also details of payments in 1514, more than ten years later, for the trousseau of her younger sister, Mary Tudor, Queen of France. Mary's embroiderer William Mortimer was supplied with gold wire, and gilt spangles for her costume were provided by the London goldsmith Robert Amadas.

In July 1503, a Scottish goldsmith, John Currour, made a crown for Margaret Tudor. He was supplied with a variety of gold coins to melt down for the metal, and was paid £20 for workmanship. The herald John Young mentions that she wore a "very rich collar of pyerrery (precious stones) and pearls", and under her crown a coif covering her hair which hung low behind.

At the Scottish court, gifts were exchanged on New Year's Day. In January 1504 James IV gave Margaret a heavy gold ducat coin and two sapphire rings. One of Margaret's ladies-in-waiting Eleanor Verney received a gold chain. Later that month, John Currour mended two collars with swans and supplied pearls for two "corses" or crosses which James gave to Margaret.

Her grandmother, Margaret Beaufort bequeathed a girdle of gold links with a great pomander for perfume to Margaret in 1509. After the death of Henry VII, Andrew Forman, Bishop of Moray, was sent to London in July 1509 to ask for jewels left to Margaret by her father.

== The jewels at Tantallon Castle ==
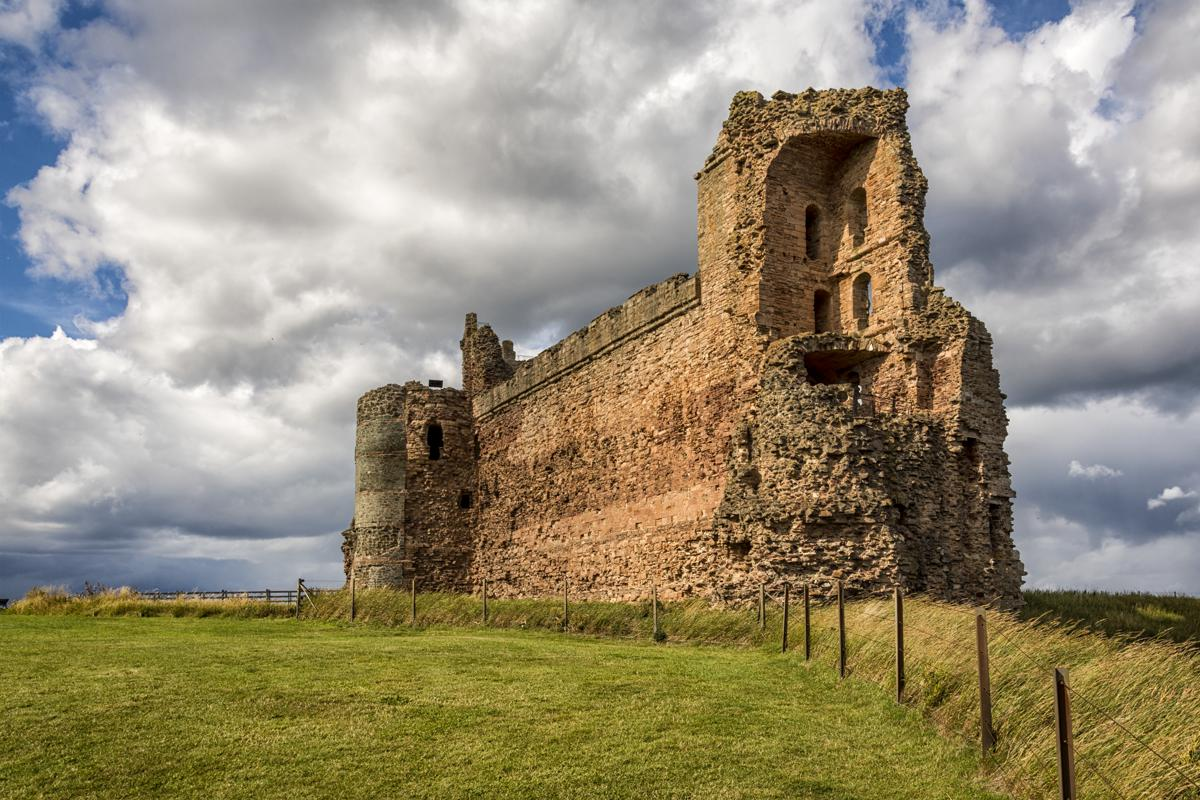
In 1515 Margaret Tudor left jewels at Tantallon Castle, which were forwarded to her at London

In September 1515 Margaret Tudor left Linlithgow Palace and went to back to England, on her way leaving a coffer of jewels at Tantallon Castle. A Scottish knight Alexander Jardine of Applegarth accepted custody of the jewels at Tantallon. Margaret wrote to Scotland for the jewels to be sent to her. There are two inventories, both written in the Scots Language which have sometimes been misinterpreted by historians. The second inventory is part of a letter written to Margaret by the Scottish Lords of Council on 29 September 1516.

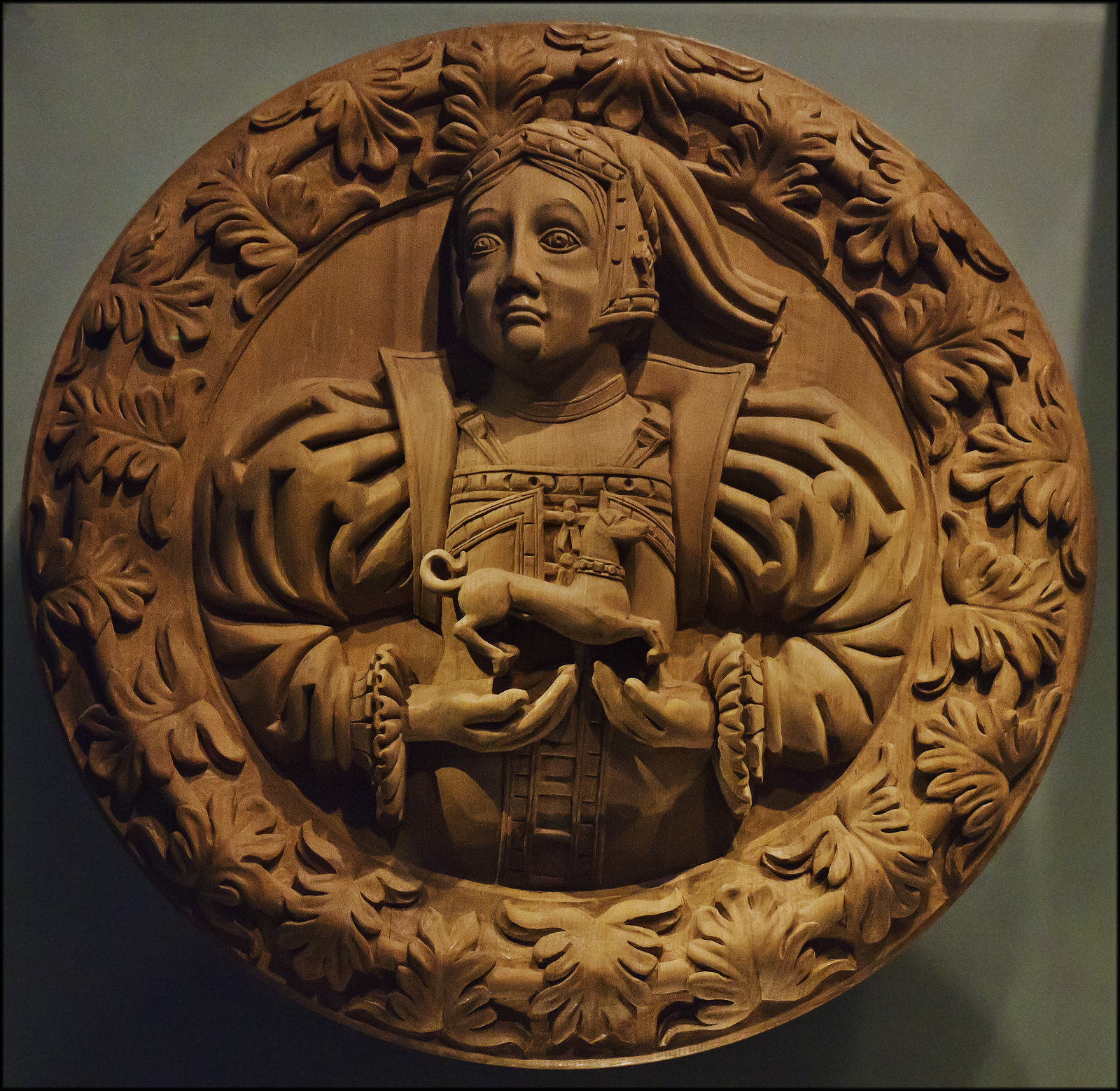
Carving at Stirling Castle thought to represent Margaret Tudor, workshop of Andrew Mansioun, 1540

The Venetian ambassador in London, Sebastian Giustinian heard a dramatic, though exaggerated and inaccurate version of Margaret's flight from Scotland, that the Duke of Albany had besieged her at Stirling Castle and she escaped. Albany pursued her and had captured her wardrobe, leaving her with only the clothes she was wearing. Albany certainly sent letters to her and others at Tantallon and Blackadder Castle as she travelled south to the English border. According to a later 16th-century Scottish writer John Lesley, Margaret surrendered Stirling Castle and the king to Albany, but then began to oppose him. Afraid of his anger, she "quyetlie from Tamtallon fled to Berwik in Ingland the 12 of August".

=== Jewels for hoods and hats ===
The jewels left at Tantallon included bands for the front of hoods or head dresses called "shaffrons", "saferons" or "chaffrouns", and called "cheverons" by the 19th-century historian Agnes Strickland. Similar words were used for the armour covering a horse's face and head. The jewels were set on velvet. The Scottish wardrobe accounts make it clear that the "chaffron" was the name of the velvet strip for a hood, made in 1511 by the queen's tailor, Thomas Edgar. Another kind of chaffron, made of gold wire costing £20 Scots, was supplied by the wife of William Currour. Jewels were also set on textile edgings called "burdes" for hoods or to border other costume. This Scottish word for "border" can be confused with similar words for "bird". In English inventories jewelled "borders" could be for the neckline for the gown or forepart, and when found in pairs were sometimes for sleeves.

A Spanish ambassador Pedro de Ayala wrote in 1498 that Scottish women "dress much better than here (in England), and especially as regards the head-dress (las cabeças), which is, I think, the handsomest in the world". It is not clear if the chaffrons mentioned in Margaret's inventory were very different from the jewelled bands worn in other countries.

There were hats with jewels called "hingers" or "targets". William Currour's wife sold Margaret a "tergat" in May 1511, which cost £18 Scots, to wear on her hood. Margaret also had partlets, worn at the shoulders set with gold fringes and pearls. There was a little coffer with reels of gold wire, perhaps for dressing her hair or for embroidery. The jewels from Tantallon were sent to Margaret at London in two installments.

=== Lists of the jewels ===
The first jewels returned to her in England included: a chaffron with a "burde" (edging) of gold, with 81 pearls; a chaffron with a chain of gold white enamelled; one chaffron with points with sets of pearl; a chaffron set with goldsmiths' work, with 35 pearls; a chaffron with leaves of gold, with 8 rubies and 18 pearls; a new chain of gold, containing 40 links and 5 knoppis, weighing 9 ounces; a pair of sleeves of gold wire; a ruff of taffeta; a partlet of black velvet, with goldsmiths' work, set with 30 pearls; and a partlet of damask gold.

A second installment included: a chaffron of black velvet with a chain containing 57 or 58 links, weighing 1 3/4 ounces; one chevron with points of gold, with 61 pearls in crammesy (crimson) velvet; a chaffron set with gold, of 21 rubies, 33 pearls; a "burde" (border or edging) of gold and two small belts, with heads and pendants of gold; details of loan of 2000 merks; a collar of gold weighing 6 ounces (made with gold braid); one piece of the Laird of Bass' chain, containing 10 links, weighing 42 ounces; a pair of sleeves of cloth of gold lined with crimson satin; another pair of sleeves of cloth of gold (unlined); the King of France's great diamond, set upon a red hat of silk; a black hat with a "hinger" of a ruby balas and three pearls; a piece of yellow satin containing 2 French ells; three other pieces of yellow satin; one piece of white taffeta; one piece of tawny satin of "ramanys"; a red velvet lining for gown sleeves; a packet with sealed letters and obligations; a collar of gold, enamelled with white roses and red, weighing 6 ounces; four pillowcases; five silk hats (without "hingars" or badges); a partlet of crimson satin with a fret of gold, with 12 diamonds, 14 rubies, 25 pearls; another partlet of cloth of gold; a partlet of white taffeta with three great pearls; a partlet of taffeta and goldsmiths' work; a pair of sleeves of black velvet; a buist (box) of damask gold, with ten pirns (hanks) of gold wire; with ribbons and sewing silk.

This consignment included rosaries and other religious items with, a pair of beads (rosary) of coral with 6 pearl gauds (gauds are the larger beads on a rosary); a pair of beads of jasper with four gauds; a pair of black beads; a pair of white beads; the queen's testament (Margaret's will); two silver boxes with holy wax; a hood of sewed work (embroidery); four pieces of crisp or crêpe; a pomander with silver; a stone of crystal; one coffer of bone or ivory; four books; and a target of gold with an image of Our Lady weighing 7 crowns.

Some jewels were collected by Thomas Dacre's agent, the Master of the college of Greystoke. Ross Herald brought jewels to her at Baynard's Castle or Scotland Yard in London in 1517. He was detained in the north of England for while, apparently on his way back.

== August 1523 ==
In August 1523, Margaret Tudor was unhappy at the prospect of the return of the Duke of Albany to Scotland. She was also short of money and was considering the sale of her cupboard of silver plate. The Earl of Surrey suggested that if Margaret Tudor came near to the border at Bunkle or Bonkyll Castle with her silver plate and jewels, pretending to intercede for the people of the Scottish Borders, he would convey her safely back to England. He advised her not to tell the Scottish lords about this offer. Margaret stayed in Scotland.

== Jewels in the inventory of James V ==
Margaret Tudor died at Methven Castle in October 1541. Some of her jewels may be included in the inventories of her son James V. He ordered Oliver Sinclair and John Tennent to pack up her belongings at Methven for his use.

In 1542 in the Jewel House of Edinburgh Castle there was a rosary of jasper beads with gold gauds, and an ornament for a woman's breast with 21 sets of pearl, with three pearls in each set. The king's servant Henry Kemp of Thomastoun kept among the king's jewels a "tablet with an image of our Lady" and two "hingers", a diamond "M" with a pendant pearl and a ruby "H" with images, possibly connected with Margaret Tudor.

== Susannah and the Elders ==
An allegorical portrait of Margaret Tudor with two companions, known as the Bute portrait, currently displayed at the National Galleries of Scotland, shows her wearing a medallion on her girdle depicting the Biblical story of Susannah and the Elders. Princess Mary gave Margaret's daughter Margaret Douglas, Countess of Lennox, a balas ruby with a table cut diamond and three mean (smaller) pendant pearls; a gold brooch with a large sapphire; a brooch of gold with a balas ruby and the "History of Susanne", and a gold brooch with the History of David, when she married the Earl of Lennox in 1544.

== See also ==
- Jewels of James III of Scotland
- Jewels of James V of Scotland
- Jewels of Mary, Queen of Scots
