= Blue Bell Hill (village) =

Village in Kent, England

Coordinates: 51.3304°N 0.504°E

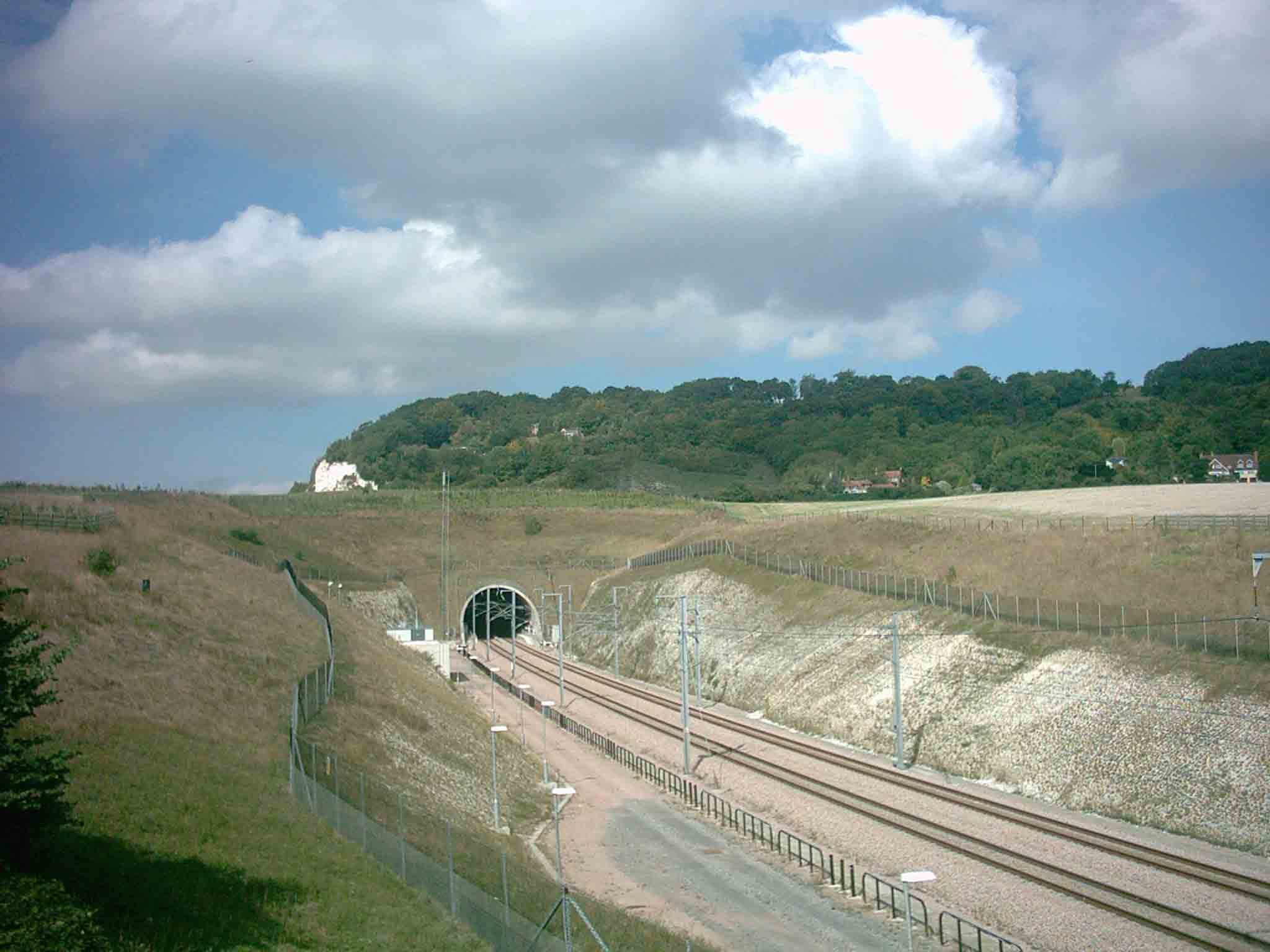
- The village is located on top of the hill, above High Speed 1's North Downs Tunnel pictured

- Location within Kent
- OS grid reference: TQ7462
- Civil parish: Aylesford
- District: Tonbridge and Malling
- Shire county: Kent
- Region: South East
- Country: England
- Sovereign state: United Kingdom
- Post town: CHATHAM
- Postcode district: ME5
- Dialling code: 01634
- Police: Kent
- Fire: Kent
- Ambulance: South East Coast
- UK Parliament: Chatham and Aylesford

Blue Bell Hill is a village in the Aylesford parish of the borough of Tonbridge and Malling in Kent, England. It is located halfway between Chatham and Maidstone and lies on top of Blue Bell Hill. The community significantly expanded with the developments of the Walderslade area in the post war years, creating several housing estates around the village.

== Transport ==
The village is located to the south of the intersection (junction 3) of the M2 and A229 and is bypassed by the A229. The A229 traces the route of a Roman road between Chatham and Maidstone, and its old route up the hill still exists (Warren Road).

There are extensive regular bus services between the Medway Towns and Maidstone by Arriva, historically Maidstone & District (the 101 and 150 routes) as well as local Bus 142 into Medway There are also numerous commuter coaches travelling into London. A council-owned car park in the village used by commuter coach services was closed in 2023, due to anti-social behaviour and lack of users.

== Local government ==
Blue Bell Hill and parts of southern Walderslade are located in the Aylesford parish of Tonbridge and Malling. The rest of Walderslade is in the borough of Medway.

== See also ==
- Buckmore Park Kart Circuit
