= Singlewell Infrastructure Maintenance Depot =

Railway maintenance depot

Coordinates: 51.408°N 0.382°E

Singlewell freight loops run either side of the main lines

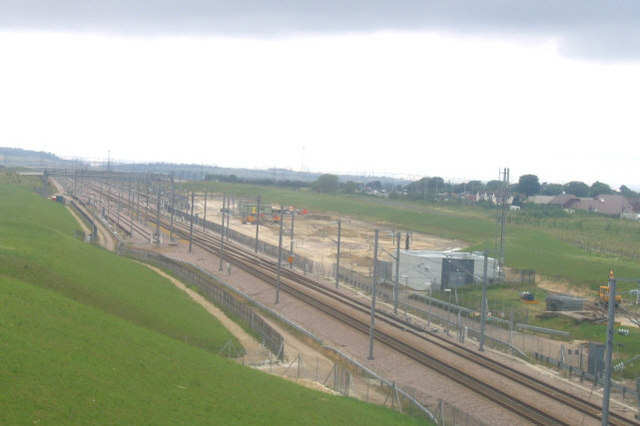
Depot buildings during construction in 2006

Depot being passed by a Southeastern Class 395 train at speed.

The Singlewell Infrastructure Maintenance Depot is a railway maintenance depot located near the Gravesend ward of Singlewell, Kent, in the United Kingdom. The depot is located between the A2 road and High Speed 1 (Channel Tunnel Rail Link). It lies halfway between Ebbsfleet International railway station and the Medway Viaducts, and is connected via a spur at the Singlewell freight loops.

When originally constructed in 2007, the area between the A2 and the depot formed a field, but the subsequent long-planned realignment of the A2 meant that the road now runs closer to the depot. The depot has fuelling facilities, workshops, plant storage and offices.
