= Nicolas Petrovic =

French business executive

- Born: 21 November 1969 (age 56); Saint-Germain-en-Laye, France
- Education: ESCP Europe, INSEAD
- Occupation: Business executive

Nicolas Petrovic (born 21 November 1969) is a French business executive who has worked for Eurostar, Siemens France, and Brightline West.

== Early life ==
He was born in Saint-Germain-en-Laye, near Paris, to a French mother and a Yugoslav father (Petrović is the common spelling). He has an older and younger sister. He gained a degree from ESCP Europe in 1991. He worked overseas for two years for Compagnie Générale des Eaux. He gained a degree from INSEAD in 2003.

== Career ==
Petrovic joined SNCF in 1994 as a junior marketing manager. He resigned from SNCF in 2000 to pursue a degree from INSEAD, which he gained in 2003.

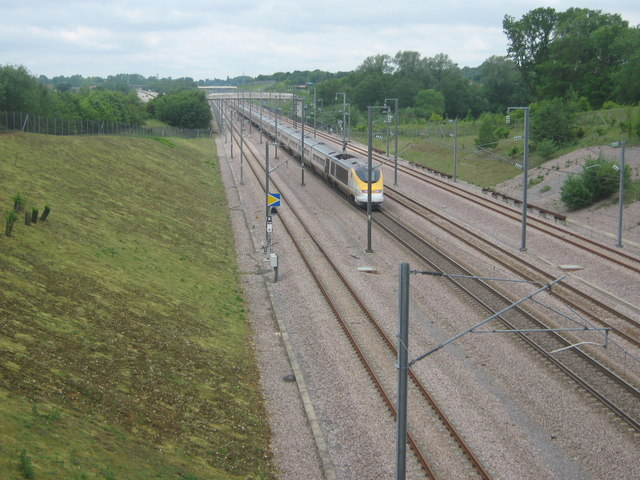
Eurostar train heading to London, in Kent, in May 2009

=== Eurostar ===
Petrovic joined Eurostar in August 2003 as Director of Customer Service. He became Chief Operating Officer (directeur général de l’exploitation d'Eurostar) in 2006, and replaced Richard Brown as the Chief Executive (directeur général d'Eurostar) in April 2010. Eurostar has 1,700 employees, with 850 in London.

=== Siemens ===
He was CEO (Président) of Siemens France from March 2018 to September 2021. The company has 6,000 employees and a turnover of 1.8 billion euros in France in the fiscal year 2021.

=== Brightline West ===
He became managing director of Brightline West in January 2026.

Business positions
Preceded by	Chief Executive of Eurostar International Limited; April 2010 -	Succeeded by Incumbent
Preceded by	Chief Operating Officer of Eurostar International Limited; 2006 - 2010	Succeeded by
