= Channel Tunnel Rail Link (Supplementary Provisions) Act 2008 =

Act of the Parliament of the United Kingdom

- Act of Parliament
- Parliament of the United Kingdom
- Long title: An Act to make provision amending, and supplementary to, the Channel Tunnel Rail Link Act 1996.
- Citation: 2008 c. 5
- Introduced by: Ruth Kelly
- Territorial extent: England and Wales; Scotland; Northern Ireland

Dates
- Royal assent: 22 May 2008
- Commencement: 22 July 2008
Other legislation
Amends	Channel Tunnel Rail Link Act 1996

Status: Current legislation

History of passage through Parliament

Text of statute as originally enacted

The Channel Tunnel Rail Link (Supplementary Provisions) Act 2008 (c. 5) is an act of the Parliament of the United Kingdom which amends the Channel Tunnel Rail Link Act 1996.

== Purpose ==
The act was needed to facilitate the restructuring of London and Continental Railways which owned the Channel Tunnel Rail Link.

The restructuring split LCR into three components:

- the infrastructure, which included the track and stations
- the land interests
- the UK government's stake in Eurostar

This then facilitated the UK government selling its stake in Eurostar.

== Provision ==
Its principal provision is to allow the Office of Rail Regulation to charge the operator of the Channel Tunnel Rail Link "a fee in respect of the exercise of any of the Office of Rail Regulation's functions in relation to the rail link".

This clarified the regulatory framework of the Channel Tunnel Rail Link.

== Passage of the bill ==
The legislation was introduced to the House of Commons as the Channel Tunnel Rail Link (Supplementary Provisions) Bill by the Secretary of State for Transport, Ruth Kelly, on 8 November 2007. The Bill was read for the third time in the House of Commons on 17 January 2008 and passed to the House of Lords with one amendment agreed. The Bill was read for the third time in the House of Lords on 13 May 2008 and was passed without further amendment.

== Section 6 - Interpretation, commencement, short title ==
Section 6(2) provides that the Act came into force at the end of the period of two months that began on the date on which it was passed. The word "months" means calendar months. The day (that is to say, 22 May 2008) on which the Act was passed (that is to say, received royal assent) is included in the period of two months. This means that the Act came into force on 22 July 2008.
