= London and Continental Railways =

Former property development company in the United Kingdom

Platform4 Rail Regeneration Limited
- Type: State-owned private limited company
- Industry: Property development
- Founded: 1994 (as LCR); 2025 (as Platform4)
- Headquarters: London, England, UK
- Owners: Department for Transport
- Website: platform4.com

Platform4 is a company originally established in 1994 as London and Continental Railways (LCR), as a private consortium to own European Passenger Services and build the Channel Tunnel Rail Link (CTRL) under a contract agreed with the UK government. After the full length of the CTRL was opened and rebranded as High Speed 1 (HS1) in late 2007, the company subsequently ran into financial difficulties and was nationalised in June 2009. LCR then became a state-owned company that developed former railway land, until it merged with Network Rail's property team in 2025 to create Platform4.

== History ==
=== Creation ===
LCR was established in 1994 during the privatisation of British Rail. LCR bid for and won the contract from the UK government in 1996 to build and operate the Channel Tunnel Rail Link between London and the Channel Tunnel, under the terms of the Channel Tunnel Rail Link Act 1996. As part of this deal European Passenger Services (EPS) and Union Railways, companies owned by British Rail, were transferred to LCR ownership, as well as key pieces of railway infrastructure including St Pancras railway station and the King's Cross Central lands nearby.

EPS was the British arm of the joint Eurostar operation, along with SNCF in France and SNCB in Belgium. LCR renamed EPS as Eurostar (UK) Ltd (EUKL). Union Railways had been developing plans for the CTRL since before the opening of the Channel Tunnel and became the construction company of the CTRL under the ownership of LCR. To aid the construction process, Union Railways was empowered by the British government to make use of compulsory purchase orders as a reserve measure for land acquisition.

The original shareholders of LCR were Bechtel (19%), Warburg (19%), Virgin Group (18%), National Express (17.5%), SNCF (8.5%), London Electricity (8.5%), Arup (3.5%), Halcrow (3%) and Systra (3%). As part of the 1996 contract, LCR was to finance and construct the CTRL itself, funding the project from income received from the Eurostar operation. LCR also planned to raise additional capital from a partial stock market flotation once the project was underway.

=== Financial problems ===
In January 1998, LCR ran into major financial difficulties after finding that income from its share of the Eurostar operation was not at the level it expected. It blamed the lower level of passenger growth on disruption caused by a November 1996 fire in the Channel Tunnel and the growth of competing low-cost airlines. LCR's planned flotation, which had already been delayed, was aborted. With the entire CTRL project in doubt, LCR appealed to the British government for help.

=== Government support ===
To enable the project to continue, LCR was allowed to issue £3.7bn of private bonds, which the government pledged to guarantee. In return the government gained a percentage of future profits from the operation of the CTRL once completed, as well as a golden share in LCR. As part of the deal LCR was forced to appoint a management contract for EUKL. This was won by Inter-Capital and Regional Rail (ICRR), a consortium of National Express (40%), SNCF (35%), SNCB (15%) and British Airways (10%). The contract was to run from 1998 until 2010.

Following the access to finance, LCR was able to begin the CTRL project. Rail Link Engineering (RLE) was appointed to design and engineer the CTRL. RLE was a group made up of the four engineering companies involved in LCR; Bechtel (50%), Arup (19%), Halcrow (17%) and Systra (14%). In addition, Railtrack was brought into the project by the government and agreed to purchase the CTRL from LCR once completed.

To reduce the risks surrounding the project, the construction was split into two phases. Section 1, from the Channel Tunnel to Fawkham Junction in Kent, was to be managed by Union Railways (South) under the control of Railtrack, who committed to purchase Section 1 from LCR once complete for the cost of its construction. The more complex part, Section 2 running from Fawkham Junction to London St Pancras was to be managed by Union Railways (North). Railtrack also purchased an option, to be exercised by 2003, to control Union Railways (North) during construction and acquire Section 2 once complete. It was intended that with the completed full-length CTRL then in Railtrack's future ownership, EUKL would then pay track access charges to use the line.

=== Railtrack crisis ===
Following a series of rail accidents and a subsequent share price collapse, Railtrack announced in April 2001 that it would not take up its option to project manage and then purchase Section 2. Instead, Section 2 would be owned on completion by LCR, with Railtrack owning Section 1 as well as being responsible for operating both sections.

In October 2001, Railtrack was placed into "railway administration" with debts of £7.1bn and in October 2002 Railtrack's assets were transferred to a newly created "not for dividend" company called Network Rail, whose debts would be guaranteed by the government. LCR re-purchased Railtrack's interest in Section 1 for £295m, meaning that both sections would once again be in LCR's ownership upon subsequent competition. Network Rail agreed to pay LCR £80m for the right to operate and maintain HS1 on LCR's behalf once complete.

=== CTRL completion ===
Section 1 of the Channel Tunnel Rail Link was completed in September 2003 and handed over by Union Railways (South) to LCR. Upon its completion, Eurostar services started running on Section 1, leading to international journey reductions of approximately 20 minutes. Furthermore, freight trains operated by EWS started running over Section 1 during April 2004.

During early 2006, the Office for National Statistics reclassified LCR as a public corporation due to LCR's reliance on government funding and the resulting high levels of influence the government enjoyed over the company. Over the next few years, rumours repeatedly circled that numerous parties, including the businessman Adrian Montague, intended to acquire LCR from its current shareholders. By late 2007, reports were emerging that the British government were contemplating breaking up LCR into three separate companies and their sale to private owners.

The Channel Tunnel Railway Link was finally finished when Section 2 was completed and handed over by Union Railways (North) to LCR. In November 2007, the full length of the line was opened to the public, rebranded as High Speed 1 (HS1). It permitted Eurostar trains to operate international train services from St Pancras railway station, and a further 20-minute journey time reduction. Furthermore, a high-speed domestic service, operated by Southeastern to London St Pancras via Ebbsfleet International and Stratford International, began in June 2009.

=== Nationalisation ===
By May 2009, LCR had become insolvent, and the government received an agreement to use state aid to purchase the line and to open it up to competition to allow other services to use it apart from Eurostar.

Following the Channel Tunnel Rail Link (Supplementary Provisions) Act 2008, the Department for Transport took direct ownership of LCR in June 2009 for a nominal price. This was possible due to the company's dependence on £5.1bn of government-guaranteed debt, and the government's special share in LCR giving it a wide range of control over the business. The government stated it planned to sell off LCR's assets, such as EUKL and HS1, as individual companies to recoup some of the large amounts of government money paid to LCR since 1998.

=== Eurostar restructuring ===
On 31 December 2009, EUKL was renamed Eurostar International Limited (EIL). On 1 September 2010, the three national Eurostar operators merged into a single company with a single management structure. Following this change, the ICRR management contract for the UK business was terminated. All Eurostar assets were transferred to EIL, with LCR's holding in the new company becoming 40%. The remaining shares were held by SNCF (55%) and SNCB (5%).

=== High Speed 1 concession ===
In November 2010, a 30-year concession to own and operate HS1 was sold to a Canadian consortium of Borealis Infrastructure and Ontario Teachers' Pension Plan for £2.1bn. The sale was somewhat controversial, largely as the highest bid made was passed over on in favour of a lower sum.

During 2017, the sale of the 30 year HS1 concession was announced to funds advised and managed by InfraRed Capital Partners and Equitix Investment Management; participants include HICL Infrastructure (35%), Equitix (35%) and South Korea's National Pension Service (30%), in exchange for £3 billion.

=== BRB (Residuary) assets ===
Following the abolition of BRB (Residuary) Limited (BRBR) on 30 September 2013, LCR took ownership of a number of former British Rail offices in Croydon, Derby, Manchester and Birmingham, as well as sites in Oxford and Leeds. It also took over the management of the closed Waterloo International railway station and North Pole depot, on behalf of the Secretary of State for Transport. The remaining BRBR assets and responsibilities were split between the Highways Agency, Network Rail and the Rail Safety and Standards Board.

=== Eurostar divestment ===
On 4 December 2013, the government announced that it intended to sell LCR's 40% stake in EIL. In June 2014, the shareholding was transferred from LCR to HM Treasury and the sale process was subsequently launched on 13 October 2014. The sale was completed to Caisse de dépôt et placement du Québec (CDPQ) (30%) and Hermes Infrastructure (10%) in May 2015, raising £760m.

=== Property development ===
Following the sale of all operational railway assets, LCR became a state-owned railway property development company, involved in regeneration projects on former railway land. Sites facilitated for development before being sold on to developers included King's Cross Central and Stratford Cross. LCR planned to bring forward property developments on several railway sites in North West England, including Manchester Mayfield.

LCR supported Network Rail to bring the closed Waterloo International railway station into operation for domestic rail services, as well as managing North Pole depot. It also provided property advice to HS2 Limited.

=== Platform4 ===
In July 2025 it was announced that LCR would merge with Network Rail's property team to create Platform4, a new state-owned railway property development company. Platform4 was subsequently launched in November 2025.

== See also ==
- Derek Hornby
- Nick Markham, Baron Markham
