= High Speed 1 =

High-speed railway linking London with the Channel Tunnel

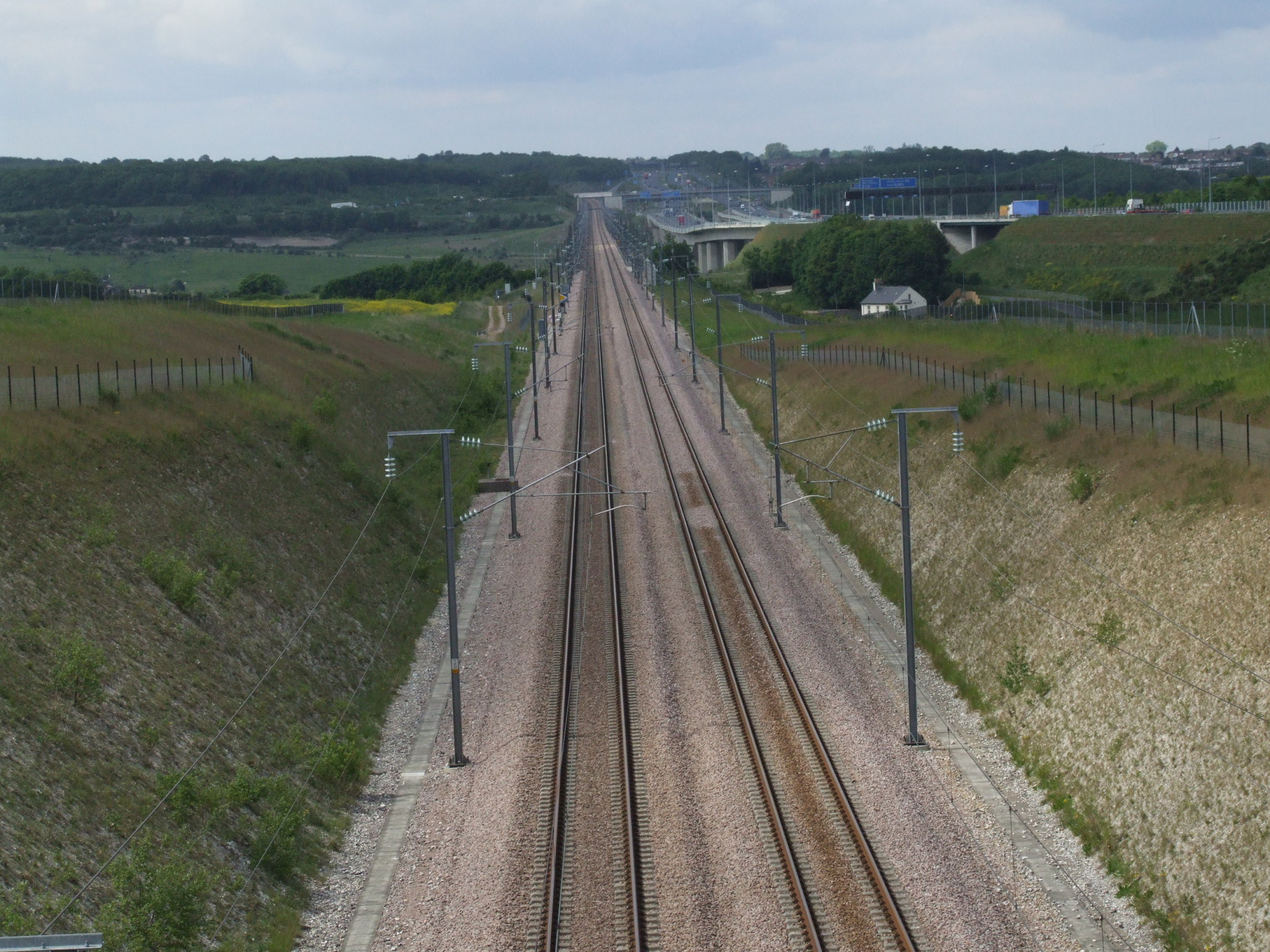
- High Speed 1 approaching the Medway Viaducts

Overview
- Owner: UK Government under concession to HS1 Limited (until 2040)
- Locale: Greater London; Essex; Kent
- Termini: London St Pancras International; Channel Tunnel (UK portal)
- Stations: 4
- Website: stpancras-highspeed.com

Service
- Type: High-speed rail; Freight rail
- System: National Rail
- Operator(s): DB Cargo UK, Eurostar, Southeastern

History
- Opened: 2003; 23 years ago (Section 1); 2007; 19 years ago (Section 2)

Technical
- Line length: 109.9 km (68.3 mi)
- Num of tracks: Double track throughout
- Track gauge: 1,435 mm (4 ft 8 1/2 in) standard gauge
- Loading gauge: UIC GC
- Electrification: Overhead line, 25 kV 50 Hz AC
- Operating speed: 300 km/h (190 mph)
- Signalling: TVM-430, KVB, AWS, TPWS
Route map
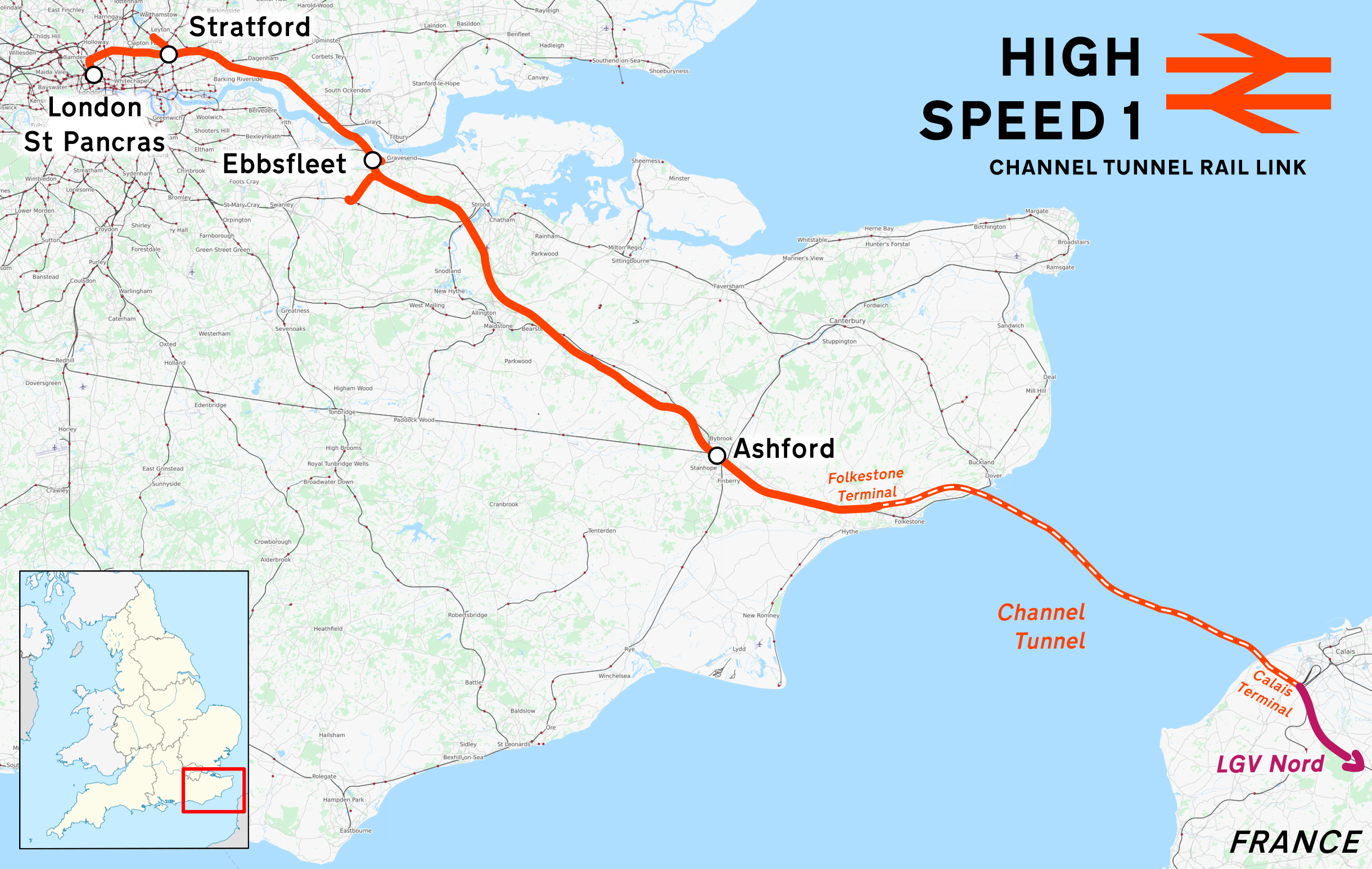
(Click to expand)

High Speed 1 (HS1), officially the Channel Tunnel Rail Link (CTRL), is a 110-kilometre (68-mile) high-speed railway linking London with the Channel Tunnel.

It is part of the line carrying international passenger traffic between the United Kingdom and mainland Europe; it also carries domestic passenger traffic to and from stations in Kent and east London, and continental European loading gauge freight traffic. From the Channel Tunnel, the line crosses the River Medway, and tunnels under the River Thames, terminating at London St Pancras International station on the north side of central London. It cost £6.84 billion to build and opened on 14 November 2007. Trains run at speeds of up to 300 km/h (190 mph) on HS1. There are intermediate stations at Stratford International in London, Ebbsfleet International in northern Kent and Ashford International in southern Kent.

International passenger services are provided by Eurostar International, with journey times from London St Pancras International to Paris Gare du Nord in 2 hours 15 minutes, and London St Pancras International to Brussels South/Bruxelles-Midi/Brussel Zuid in 1 hour 51 minutes. As of 2026, Eurostar uses a fleet of 8 Class 373 multi-system trains capable of 300 km/h (190 mph) and 17 Class 374 trains capable of 320 km/h (200 mph). Domestic high-speed commuter services serving intermediate stations and beyond began on 13 December 2009. The fleet of 29 Class 395 passenger trains reach speeds of 225 km/h (140 mph). DB Cargo UK run freight services on High Speed 1 using adapted Class 92 locomotives, enabling flat wagons carrying continental-size swap body containers to reach London for the first time.

The CTRL project saw new bridges and tunnels built, with a combined length nearly as long as the Channel Tunnel itself, and significant archaeological research undertaken. In 2002, the CTRL project was awarded the Major Project Award at the British Construction Industry Awards.

== Route ==
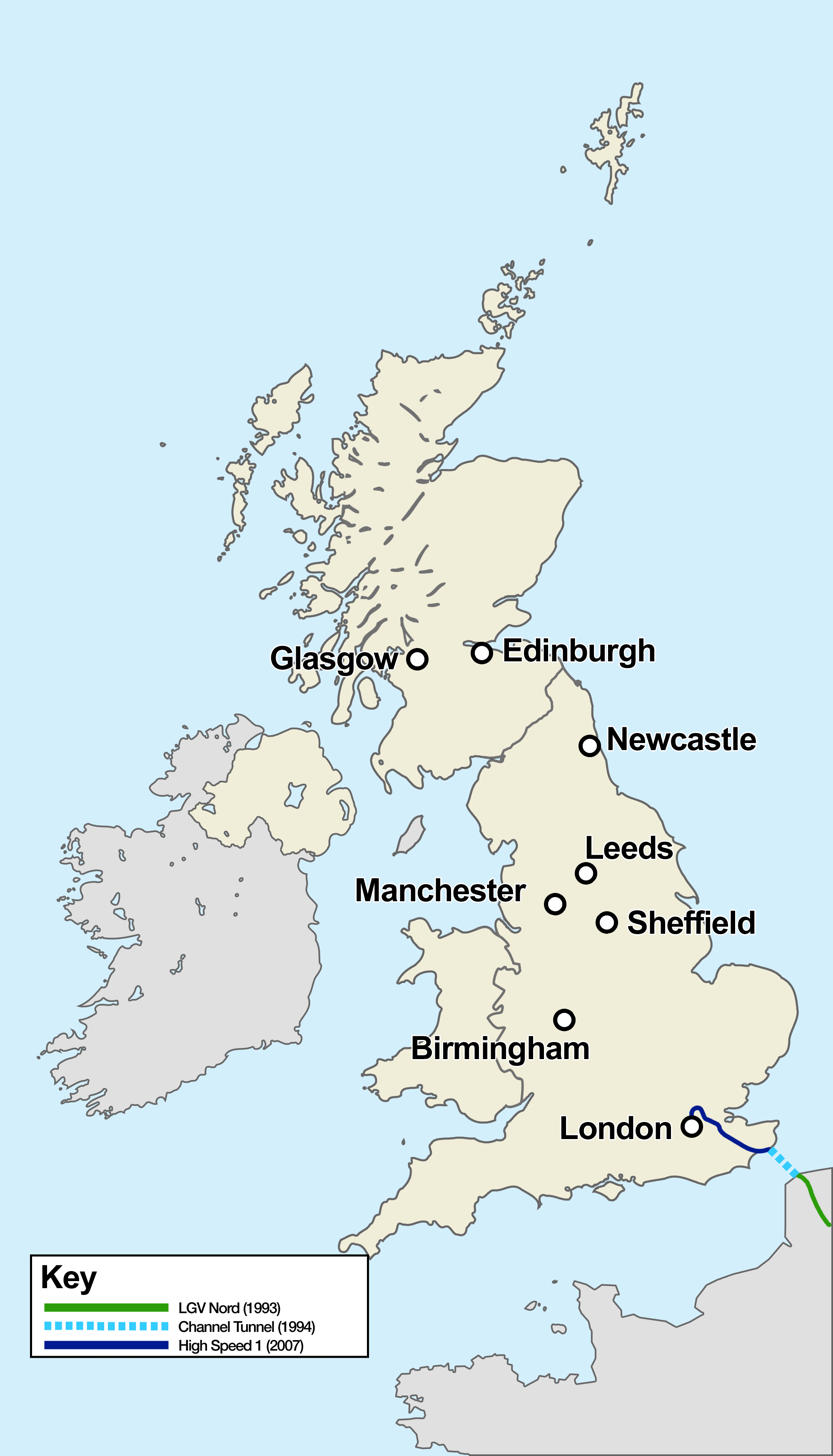
HS1 within the United Kingdom, with the Channel Tunnel and LGV Nord also shown

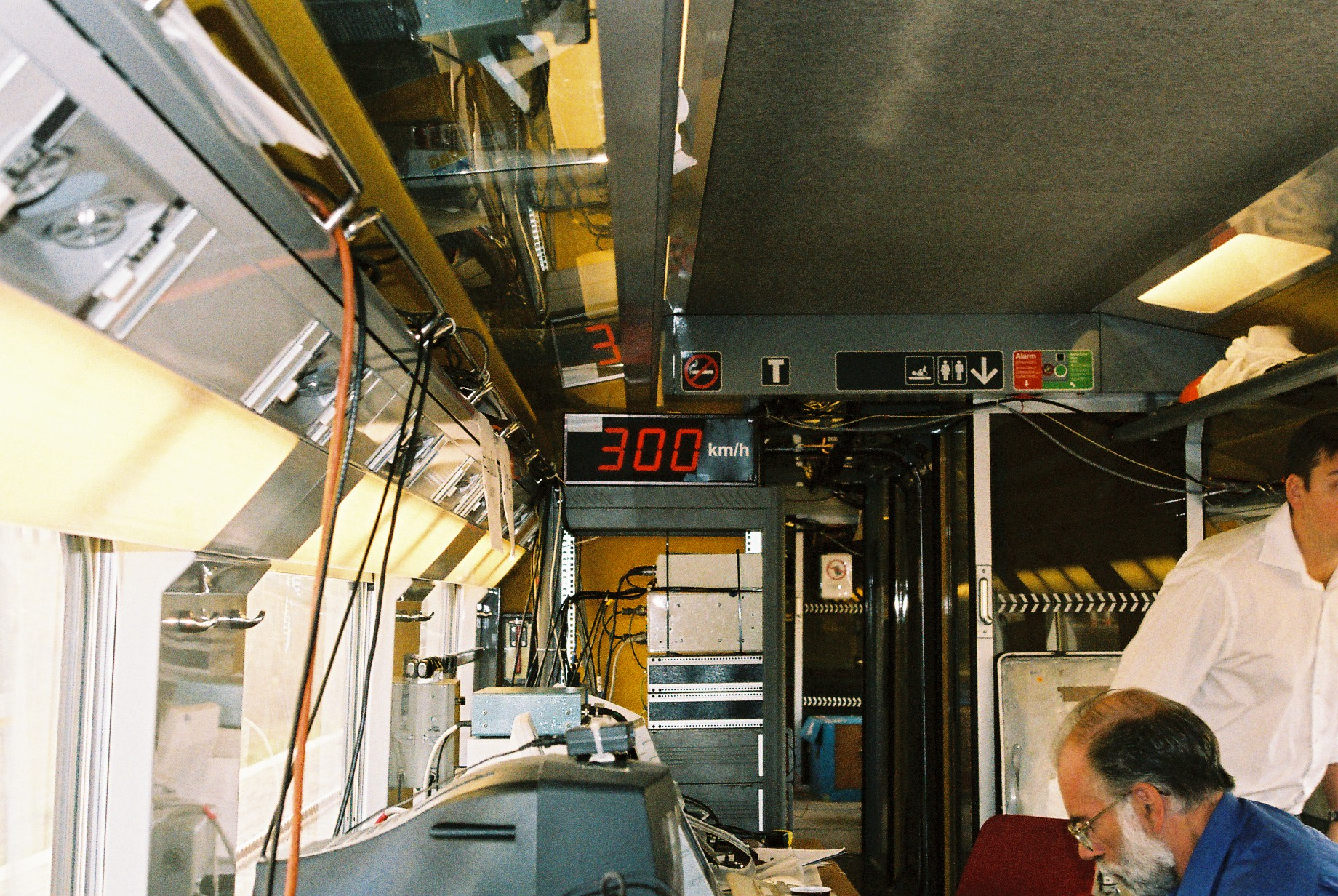
Train 3313/3314 served as a laboratory train, reaching 300 km/h (190 mph) during Section 1 testing in 2003

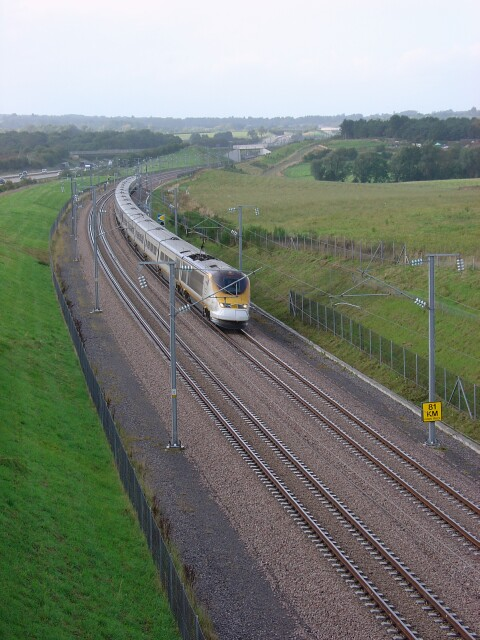
A Eurostar train on the CTRL, near Ashford

The high-speed railway operates as a "seven-day railway", with full availability on all days. Heavy maintenance is performed overnight. As of 2008, track access charges were capped at approximately £71.35 per minute. In 2008, the cost of running a train along the full length of the line between St Pancras and the Channel Tunnel was £2,244; with lower costs of £2,192 for a domestic service to Ashford International, or £1,044 for St Pancras to Ebbsfleet International. A discounted rate of £4.00 per kilometre was made available for night-time-only rail-freight operation until 31 March 2015.

=== Section 1 ===
Section 1 of the Channel Tunnel Rail Link, opened on 28 September 2003, is a 74 km (46 mi) section of high-speed track from the Channel Tunnel to Fawkham Junction in north Kent with a maximum speed of 300 km/h (190 mph). Its completion cut the London–Paris journey time by around 21 minutes, to 2 hours 35 minutes. The line includes the Medway Viaduct, a 1.2 km (0.75 mi) bridge over the River Medway, and the North Downs Tunnel, a 3.2 km (2.0 mi) long, 12 m (39 ft) diameter tunnel. In safety testing on the section prior to opening, a new UK rail speed record of 334.7 km/h (208 mph) was set. Much of the new line runs alongside the M2 and M20 motorways through Kent. After its completion, Eurostar trains continued to use suburban lines to enter London, arriving at Waterloo International.

Unlike most LGV stations in France, the through tracks for Ashford International station are off to one side rather than going through, partly because the station pre-dates the line. High Speed 1 approaches Ashford International from the north in a cut-and-cover "box"; the southbound line rises out of this cutting and crosses over the main tracks to enter the station. The main tracks then rise out of the cutting and over a flyover. On leaving Ashford, southbound Eurostars return to the high-speed line by travelling under this flyover and joining from the outside. The international platforms at Ashford are supplied with both overhead 25 kV AC and third-rail 750 V DC power, avoiding the need to switch power supplies. Within Ashford, the speed limit on HS1 is 270 km/h (170 mph).

=== Section 2 ===
Section 2 of the project opened on 14 November 2007, and is a 39.4 km (24.5 mi) stretch of track from the newly built Ebbsfleet station in Kent to London St Pancras. Completion of the section cut journey times by a further 20 minutes (London–Paris in 2 hours 15 minutes; London–Brussels in 1 hour 51 minutes). The route starts with a 3.1 km (1.9 mi) tunnel which dives under the Thames on the edge of Swanscombe, then runs alongside the London, Tilbury and Southend line as far as Dagenham, where it enters two long tunnels to reach St Pancras. The two tunnels (much of which is directly under the North London Line) are 10.1 km (6.3 mi) and the 7.5 km (4.7 mi) in length, split by a 1 km (0.62 mi) stretch that runs close to the surface to serve Stratford International and the Temple Mills Depot. The new depot, to the north of Stratford, replaced the North Pole depot in the west of London. In testing, the first Eurostar train ran into St Pancras on 6 March 2007. All CTRL connections are fully grade-separated.

== History ==
=== Background and planning ===
A high-speed rail line, LGV Nord, has been in operation between the Channel Tunnel and the outskirts of Paris since the Tunnel's opening in 1994. This has enabled Eurostar rail services to travel at 300 km/h (185 mph) for this part of their journey. A similar high-speed line in Belgium, from the French border to Brussels, HSL 1, opened in 1997. In Britain, Eurostar trains had to run at a maximum of 160 km/h (100 mph) on existing tracks between London Waterloo International and the Channel Tunnel. These tracks were shared with local traffic, limiting the number of services that could be run, and jeopardising reliability. The case for a high-speed line similar to the continental part of the route was recognised by policymakers, and the construction of the line was authorised by Parliament with the Channel Tunnel Rail Link Act 1996, which was amended by the Channel Tunnel Rail Link (Supplementary Provisions) Act 2008.

An early plan conceived by British Rail in the early 1970s for a route passing through Tonbridge met considerable opposition on environmental and social grounds, especially from the Leigh Action Group and Surrey & Kent Action on Rail (SKAR). A committee was set up to examine the proposal under Sir Alexander Cairncross; but in due course environment minister Anthony Crosland announced that the project had been cancelled, together with the plan for the tunnel itself.

The next plan for the Channel Tunnel Rail Link involved a tunnel reaching London from the south-east, and an underground terminus in the vicinity of London King's Cross station. A late change in the plans, principally driven by Deputy Prime Minister Michael Heseltine's desire for urban regeneration in East London, led to a change of route, with the new line approaching London from the east. This opened the possibility of reusing the underused St Pancras railway station as the terminus, with access via the North London Line that crosses the throat of the station.

The idea of using the North London line proved illusory, and it was rejected in 1994 by the then Transport Secretary, John MacGregor, as too difficult to construct and environmentally damaging. The idea of using St Pancras station as the core of the new terminus was retained, albeit now linked by 20 km (12 mi) of specially built tunnels to Dagenham via Stratford.

London & Continental Railways (LCR) was chosen by the UK government in 1996 to build the line and to reconstruct St Pancras station as its terminus, and to take over the British share of the Eurostar operation, Eurostar (UK). The original LCR consortium members were National Express, Virgin Group, SG Warburg & Co, Bechtel and London Electric. While the project was under development by British Rail it was managed by Union Railways, which became a wholly owned subsidiary of LCR.

=== Construction ===
As the Channel Tunnel Act 1987 made government funding for a Channel Tunnel rail link unlawful, construction did not take place, as it was not financially viable. Construction was delayed until the passage of the Channel Tunnel Rail Link Act 1996, which provided construction powers that would run for ten years. The chief executive, Rob Holden, stated that it was the "largest land acquisition programme since the Second World War".

The whole route was to have been built as a single project, but in 1998, serious financial difficulties arose, and extensive changes came with a British government rescue plan. To reduce risk, the line was split into two separate phases, to be managed by Union Railways (South) and Union Railways (North). A recovery programme was agreed whereby LCR sold government-backed bonds worth £1.6 billion to pay for the construction of Section 1, with the future of Section 2 still not settled.

The original intention had been for the new railway, once completed, to be run by Union Railways as a separate line from the rest of the British railway network. As part of the 1998 rescue it was agreed that following completion, Section 1 would be purchased by Railtrack with an option to purchase section 2. In return, Railtrack was committed to operate the whole route as well as London St Pancras International, which, unlike all other former British Rail stations, had been transferred to LCR/Union Railways in 1996.

In 2001, Railtrack announced that because of its own financial problems, it would not undertake to purchase Section 2, triggering a second restructuring. The 2002 plan agreed that the two sections would have different owners (Railtrack for Section 1, LCR for Section 2) but with common Railtrack management. Following further financial problems at Railtrack, its interest was sold back to LCR, which then sold the operating rights for the completed line to Network Rail, Railtrack's successor. Under this arrangement LCR became the sole owner of both sections of the CTRL and the St Pancras property, as per the original 1996 plan. Amendments were made in 2001 for the new station at Stratford International and connections to the West Coast Main Line.

As a consequence of the restructuring, the LCR consortium in 2001 consisted of engineering consultants and construction firms Arup, Bechtel, Halcrow and Systra (which form Rail Link Engineering (RLE)); transport operators National Express and SNCF (which operates the Eurostar (UK) share of the Eurostar service with the National Railway Company of Belgium and British Airways), electricity company EDF and UBS.

There were several deaths of employees working on the CTRL over the construction period. One occurred on 28 March 2003 near Folkestone when a worker came into contact with the energised power supply. Another death occurred two months later, in May 2003, when a scaffolder fell 7 m (23 ft) at Thurrock, Essex. Three companies were found guilty of breaching health and safety legislation by omitting to provide barriers, resulting in Deverson Direct Ltd. being ordered to pay a fine of £50,000, J.Murphy & Sons Ltd £25,000, and Hochtief £25,000. Two more deaths resulted from a fire on board a train carrying wires, one mile (1.6 km) inside a tunnel under the Thames between Swanscombe, Kent, and Thurrock, Essex on 16 August 2005. The train shunter died at the scene and the train driver later died in hospital. It has been suggested that a large amount of blame for accidents throughout the project lay with individual behaviour, becoming such a problem that an internal programme was launched to tackle problem behaviour during the construction.

The cost of construction was £6.84 billion. At £62 million per kilometre, this was higher than other projects in many other countries. The French LGV Est, a line built largely through near-flat fields (save for the Saverne Tunnel) and which terminates outside its urban centres (Vaires-sur-Marne for Paris and Vendenheim for Strasbourg) cost £22 million per mile. Its phase one was completed in 2003 and phase two in 2007.

=== Ownership and operation ===
On completion of section 1 by RLE, the line was handed over to Union Railways (South), which then handed it over to London & Continental Stations and Property (LCSP), the line's long-term owners. Once section 2 of the line had been completed, it was handed over to Union Railways (North), which handed it over to LCSP. The entire line, including St Pancras, is managed, operated and maintained by Network Rail (CTRL).

In February 2006, there were rumours that a 'third party' (believed to be a consortium headed by banker Sir Adrian Montague) had expressed an interest in buying out the present partners in the project. LCR shareholders rejected the proposal, and the government, which could effectively overrule shareholders' decisions as a result of LCR's reclassification as a state-owned body, decided that discussions with shareholders would not take place imminently, which effectively backed shareholders' views on the proposed takeover.

On 14 November 2006, LCR adopted High Speed 1 as the brand name for the completed railway. Official legislation, documentation and line-side signage have continued to refer to "CTRL".

By May 2009, LCR had become insolvent, and the government received an agreement to use state aid to purchase the line and to open it up to competition to allow other services to use it apart from Eurostar. LCR's wholly owned subsidiary, HS1 Ltd, thus became the property of the Secretary of State for Transport. On 12 October 2009 a proposal was announced to sell £16 billion of state assets including HS1 Ltd in the following two years to cut UK public debt.

In November 2010, the HS1 concession was awarded for a duration of thirty years to an investment consortium bringing together two Canadian public pension funds: Ontario Municipal Employees Retirement System (through its subsidiary Borealis Infrastructure), and Ontario Teachers' Pension Plan for £2.1 billion. At the time, UK pension investors had generally limited interest in such long-term, illiquid, 'infrastructure assets'.

Under the concession, HS1 Ltd has the rights to sell access to track and to the four international stations (St Pancras, Stratford, Ebbsfleet and Ashford) on a commercial basis, under the scrutiny of the Office of Rail and Road. At the end of thirty years, ownership of the assets will revert to the government. The private operator does not hold the freehold or rights to any of the associated land.

In 2017, the sale of the 30 year HS1 concession was announced to funds advised and managed by InfraRed Capital Partners and Equitix Investment Management; participants include HICL Infrastructure (35%), Equitix (35%) and South Korea's National Pension Service (30%), for an enterprise value of £3 billion.

HS1 Ltd rebranded as London St. Pancras Highspeed in February 2025.

== Stations ==
In geographic order:

=== St Pancras International ===
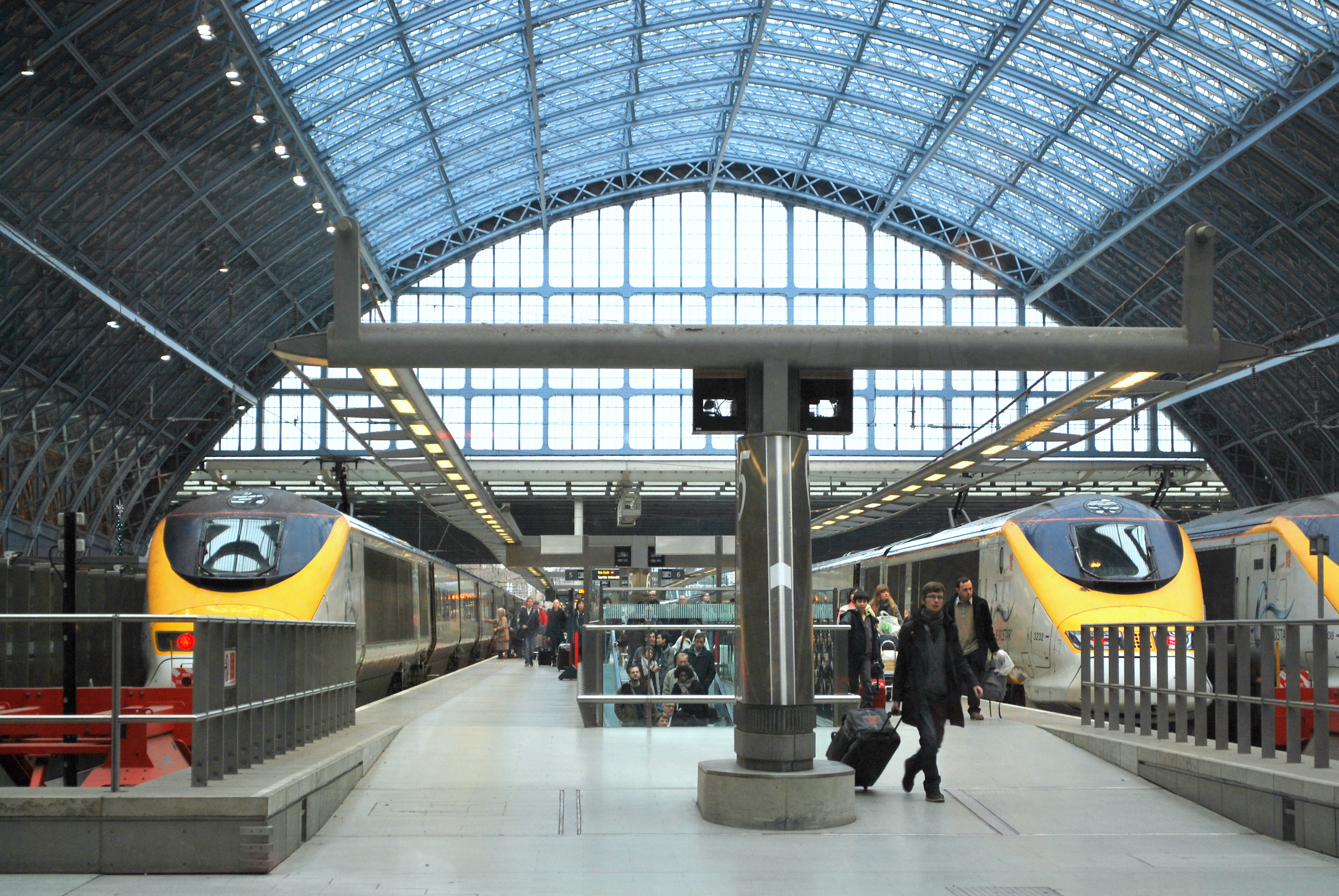
Eurostar trains at St Pancras International

The terminus for the high-speed line in London is St Pancras railway station. During the 2000s, towards the end of the construction of the CTRL, the entire station complex was renovated, expanded and renamed as St Pancras International, with a new security-sealed terminal area for Eurostar trains to continental Europe. In addition, it retained traditional domestic connections to the north and south of England. The new extension doubled the length of the central platforms now used for Eurostar services; new platforms have been provided for existing domestic East Midlands Trains and the Southeastern high-speed services that run along HS1 to Kent. New platforms on the Thameslink line across London were built beneath the western margins of the station, and the station at King's Cross Thameslink was closed.

A complex junction has been built north of St Pancras with connections to the East Coast Main Line, North London Line (for West Coast Main Line) and Midland Main Line, allowing for a wide variety of potential destinations albeit on conventional rails. As part of the works, tunnels connecting the East Coast Main Line to the Thameslink route were also built in readiness for the forthcoming Thameslink Programme.

=== Stratford International ===
Stratford International railway station was not part of the original government plans for the CTRL. Despite its name, no international services have ever called there. Completed in April 2006, it opened on 30 November 2009 when the domestic preview Southeastern highspeed services started calling there. An extension of the Docklands Light Railway opened to Stratford International in August 2011. It forms part of the complex of railway stations for the main site where the 2012 Summer Olympics were held.

=== Ebbsfleet International ===
Ebbsfleet International railway station in the borough of Dartford, Kent is 10 mi (16 km) outside the eastern boundary of Greater London and opened to the public on 19 November 2007. It became Eurostar's main station in Kent. Two of the platforms are designed for international passenger trains and four for high-speed domestic services. A high-speed domestic service operated by Southeastern to London St Pancras began on 29 June 2009. Eurostar has not served the station since the COVID-19 pandemic in 2020, and services will not return until at least 2026.

=== Ashford International ===
This station was rebuilt as Ashford International during the early 1990s for international services from mainland Europe; this included the addition of two platforms to the north of station (the original down island platform had been taken over by international services). Unlike normal LGV stations in France, the through tracks for Ashford International railway station are off to one side rather than going through. The number of services was reduced after the opening of the Ebbsfleet station. A high-speed domestic service operated by Southeastern to London St Pancras began on 29 June 2009. Eurostar has not served the station since the COVID-19 pandemic in 2020, and services will not return until at least 2026.

HS1 Ltd. (London St. Pancras Highspeed) also operates the Singlewell Infrastructure Maintenance Depot.

Temple Mills Depot in London Leyton, roughly 2 km (1.2 mi) northwest of Stratford International station, is used for storage and servicing of Eurostar trains and off-peak berthing of Class 395 Southeastern high-speed trains.

== Infrastructure ==
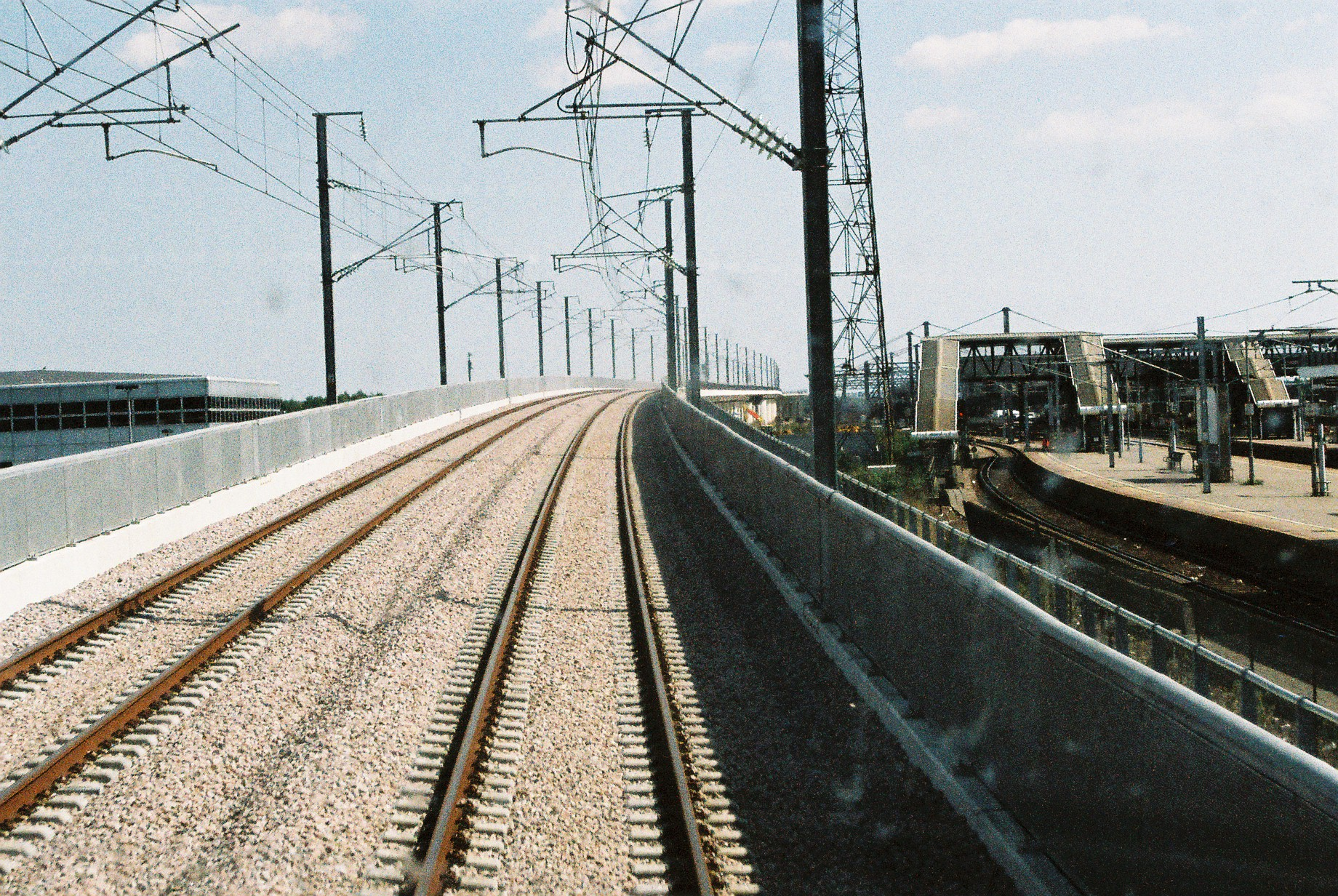
A high-speed tunnel and flyover take non-stopping trains past Ashford International at 270 km/h (170 mph)

The railway is maintained from Singlewell Infrastructure Maintenance Depot.

The construction work of the line was complex, and many contractors were involved in delivering them. The CTRL Section 2 construction works had caused considerable disruption around the Kings Cross area of London; in their wake redevelopment was stimulated. The large redevelopment area includes the run-down areas of post-industrial and ex-railway land close to King's Cross and St Pancras, a conservation area with many listed buildings; this was promoted as one of the benefits for building the CTRL. It has been postulated that this development was actually suppressed by the construction project, and some affected districts were said still to be in a poor state in 2005.

=== Track ===
Both track and signalling technology (TVM-430 + KVB) are based on or identical to the standards used on the French LGV high-speed lines. The areas around St Pancras and Gare du Nord use colour light and KVB signalling with the whole of the high-speed route to Paris (CTRL, Channel Tunnel, LGV Nord) using TVM-430. Traffic between London and the Channel Tunnel is controlled from the Ashford signalling centre. Signalling tests before opening were performed by the SNCF-owned "Lucie" test car.

The track is 1,435 mm (4 ft 8 1/2 in) standard gauge cleared to a larger modern European GC loading gauge enabling GC gauge freight as far as the yards at Barking. The line is electrified entirely using overhead lines with 25 kV AC railway electrification.

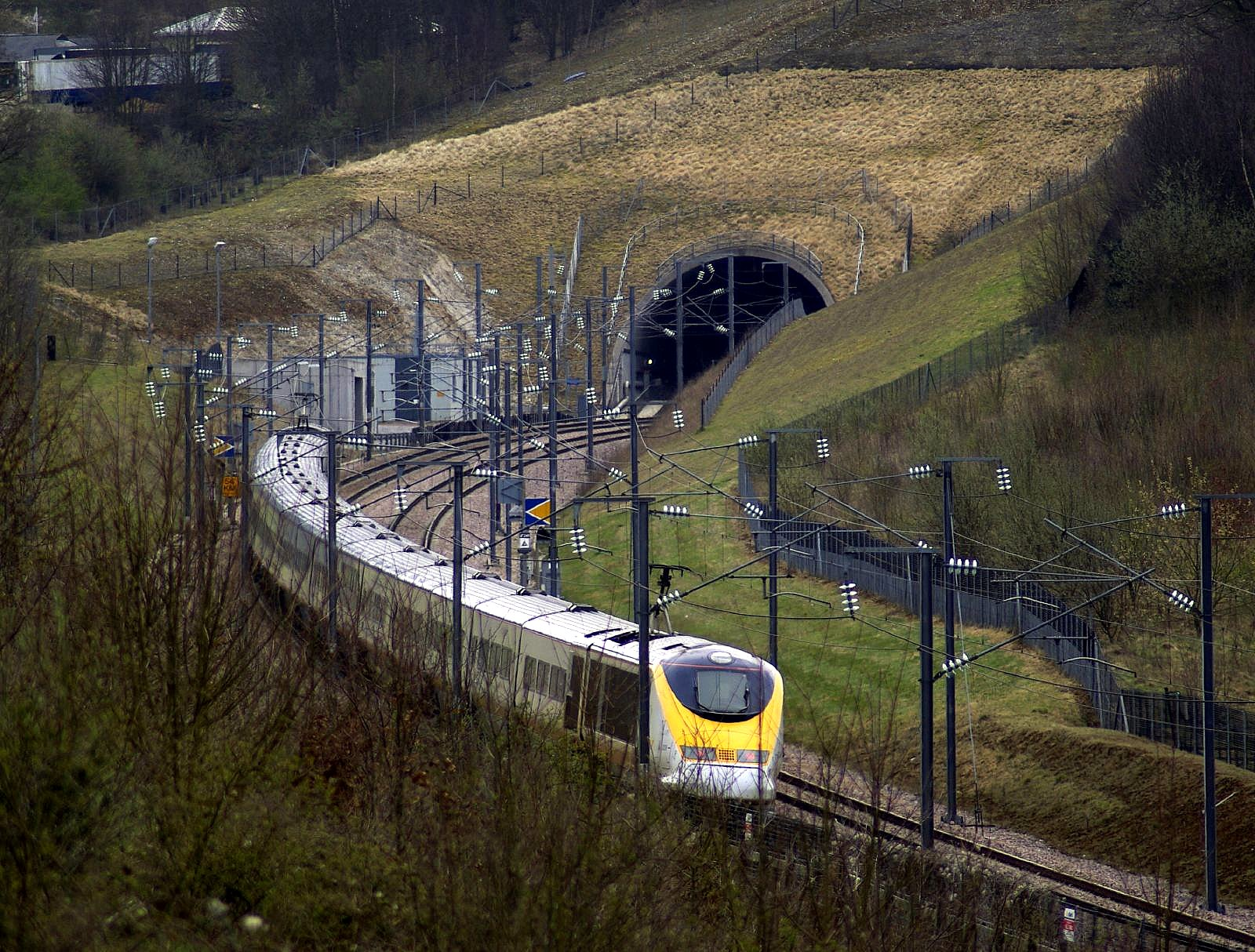
North Downs Tunnel, northern portal under Blue Bell Hill

=== Tunnels ===
After local protests, early plans were modified to put more of the route into tunnels up until a point approximately 2 km (1.2 mi) from St Pancras. Previously the CTRL was planned to run on an elevated section alongside the North London Line on approach into the line's terminus. The twin tunnels bored under London were driven from Stratford westwards towards St Pancras, eastwards towards Dagenham and from Dagenham westwards to connect with the tunnel from Stratford. The tunnel boring machines were 120 m (394 ft) long and weighed 1,100 tonnes (1,083 long tons; 1,213 short tons). The depth of the tunnels varies from 24 to 50 m (79 to 164 ft). The two London tunnels are 7.5 kilometres (4.7 mi) and 10.1 kilometres (6.3 mi) in length, split by Stratford International station.

Other major tunnels along the route include a 3.1 km (1.9 mi) tunnel underneath the River Thames at Thurrock in Essex and the 3.2 km (2.0 mi) North Downs Tunnel near Maidstone in Kent.

=== Viaducts ===
Several major viaducts are present on the route, with three viaducts over 1,000 m (3,300 ft) in length. The Medway Viaduct takes the line over the River Medway adjacent to the M2 motorway, the Thurrock Viaduct takes the line under the A282 Dartford Crossing and the Ashford Viaduct takes the fast lines over Ashford International station.

=== Connection line to Waterloo ===
A four-kilometre (2.5 mi) connecting line providing access for Waterloo International leaves High Speed 1 at Southfleet Junction using a grade-separated junction; the main CTRL tracks continue uninterrupted through to CTRL Section 2 underneath the southbound flyover. The connection joins the Chatham Main Line at Fawkham Junction with a flat crossing. The retention of Eurostar services to Waterloo after the line to St Pancras opened was ruled out on cost grounds. Waterloo International closed upon opening of the section two of the CTRL in November 2007; Eurostar now serves the refurbished St Pancras as its only London terminal, so this connecting line is no longer used in regular service, but can be used by Class 395 passenger trains.

== Services ==
International passenger services on this line are operated by Eurostar, with maximum speed 300 km/h (190 mph), while domestic passenger services are operated by Southeastern as far as Ashford International, with maximum speed 225 km/h (140 mph).

High Speed 1 was built to allow eight trains per hour through to the Channel Tunnel. As of May 2014, Eurostar runs two to three trains per hour in each direction between London and the Channel Tunnel. Southeastern runs in the high peak eight trains per hour between London and Ebbsfleet, two of these continuing to Ashford. During the 2012 Olympic Games, Southeastern provided the Olympic Javelin service with up to twelve trains per hour from Stratford into London.

=== Freight ===
The route was built with freight provision from the beginning. It has spurs leading to and from the freight terminal at Dollands Moor (Folkestone) and the freight depot at Barking (Ripple Lane), north of the River Thames. Long passing loops to hold freight trains while passenger trains overtake them were built at Lenham Heath and Singlewell.

Freight trains operated by EWS first ran over CTRL Section 1, on the consecutive evenings of 3–4 April 2004. Five freight trains that would have run via the classic lines were diverted to run over the Channel Tunnel Rail Link instead: three southbound intermodal trains on 3 April 2004 and two northbound intermodal trains on 4 April 2004.

== Operators ==
The railway is operated on an open access basis. Trains are operated by several organisations all operating over the same track. HS1 Ltd. is the network manager for the line, stations, and other infrastructure. Since February 2025, HS1 Ltd. has traded as London St. Pancras Highspeed, which it suggests would reflect a more consumer-facing role whilst looking at options to expand capacity at London St Pancras International railway station.

=== Network Rail (High Speed) Ltd ===
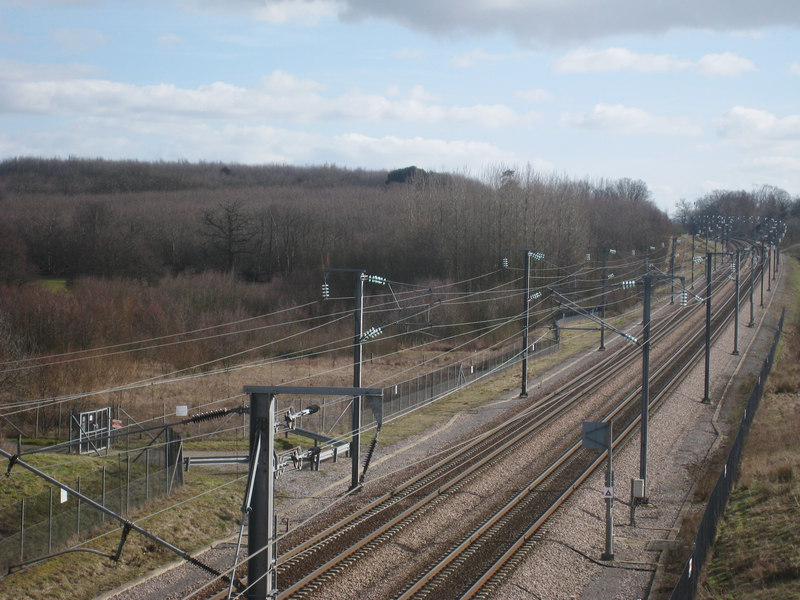
HS1 near the village of Hothfield in Kent

HS1 Ltd is responsible for overall managing and running of the line – along with the international railway stations at St Pancras, Stratford, Ashford and Ebbsfleet – with responsibility for the infrastructure itself sub-contracted to Network Rail (High Speed) Ltd (formerly known as Network Rail (CTRL)) acting as the controller and infrastructure manager. Network Rail (CTRL) Limited was created as a subsidiary of Network Rail on 26 September 2003 for £57 million to take over the assets of the CTRL renewal and maintenance operations. Network Rail (High Speed) operates engineering, track maintenance machines, rescue locomotives, and infrastructure- and test trains. Eurotunnel's subsidiary Europorte 2 operates its Eurotunnel Class 0001 (Krupp/MaK 6400) rescue locomotives on the line when required.

Various track recording trains run as necessary, including visits by the New Measurement Train. On the night of 4/5 May 2011 the SNCF TGV Iris 320 laboratory train took over, being hauled from Coquelles to St Pancras and back, towed by Eurotunnel Krupp locomotives numbers 4 and 5. The Iris 320 runs for Network Rail (High Speed) are an extension of the 100 km/h (62 mph) monitoring cycle already undertaken by SNCF International since December 2010 for Eurotunnel every two months.

=== Eurostar ===
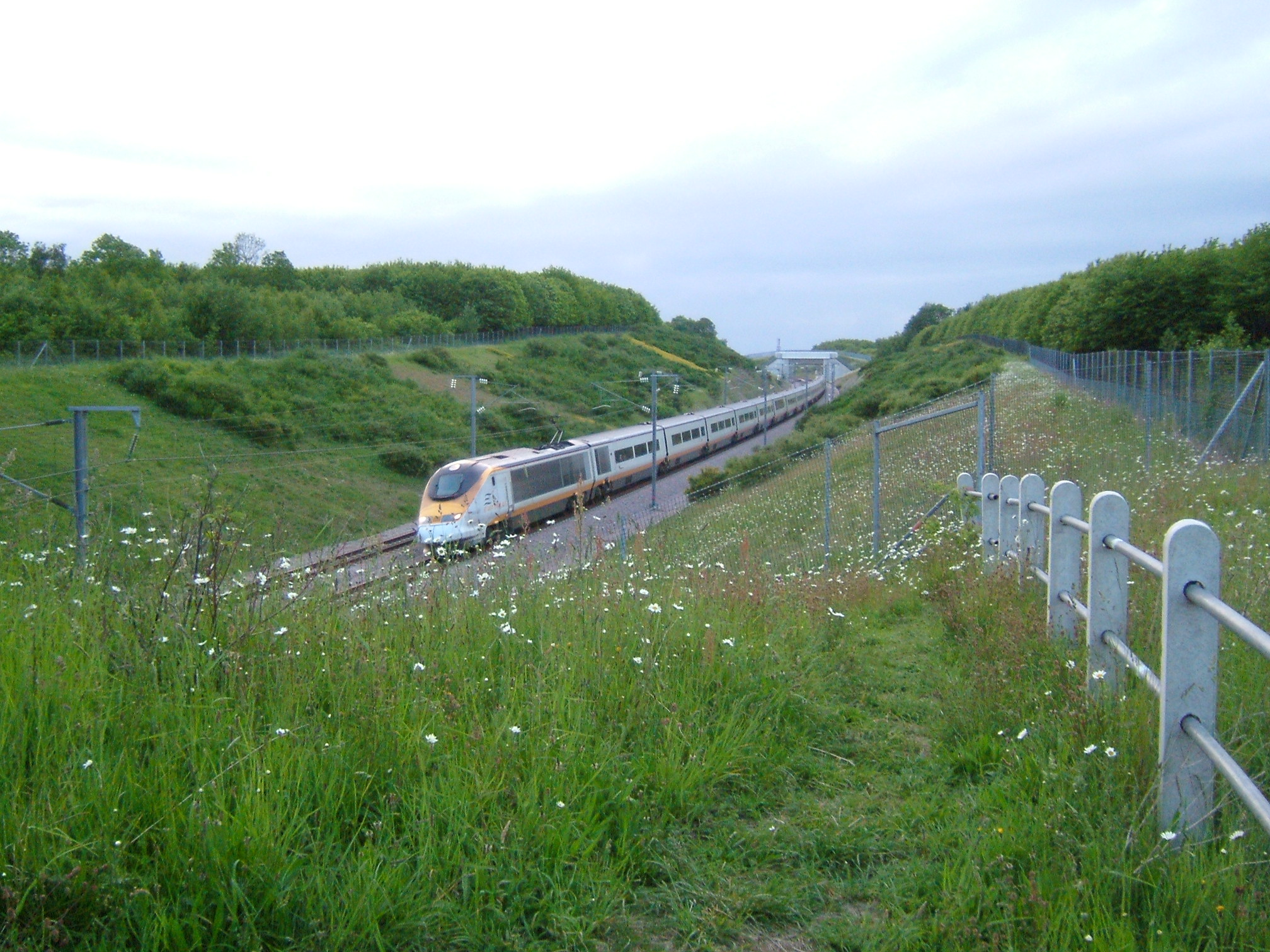
A Eurostar train in the original livery passing Strood, on approach to the Medway bridge

The Eurostar service uses about 40% of the capacity of High Speed 1, which in November 2007 became the company's route for all its services prior to the merger with Thalys. Eurostar trains are for international traffic only, passing along the high-speed line from London St Pancras railway station to the Channel Tunnel, with the majority terminating at either Paris Gare du Nord in France or Brussels-South railway station in Belgium. A Eurostar train was used to set a new British rail speed record of 334.7 km/h (208 mph) on 30 July 2003. Prior to the formation of Eurostar International Limited, the British component of the Eurostar grouping was owned by London & Continental Railways, which had also previously owned the High Speed 1 infrastructure.

The fastest regular-service Eurostar journeys on record are 2 hours, 3 minutes and 39 seconds from Paris Gare du Nord to St Pancras, set on 4 September 2007; and 1 hour 43 minutes from Brussels South to St Pancras, set on 19 September 2007.

| Class | Image | Type | Top speed | | Number | Routes operated | Built |
| Class | Image | Type | mph | km/h | Number | Routes operated | Built |
|---|---|---|---|---|---|---|---|
| Class 373; Eurostar e300 | | EMU | 186 | 300 | 28 | London–Paris; London–Brussels; London–Marne-la-Vallée – Chessy; London–Bourg Saint Maurice; London–Marseille Saint-Charles | 1992–1996 |
| Class 374; Eurostar e320 | | EMU | 200 | 320 | 17 | London–Paris; London–Marne-la-Vallée – Chessy; London–Amsterdam Centraal | 2011–2018 |

=== Southeastern ===
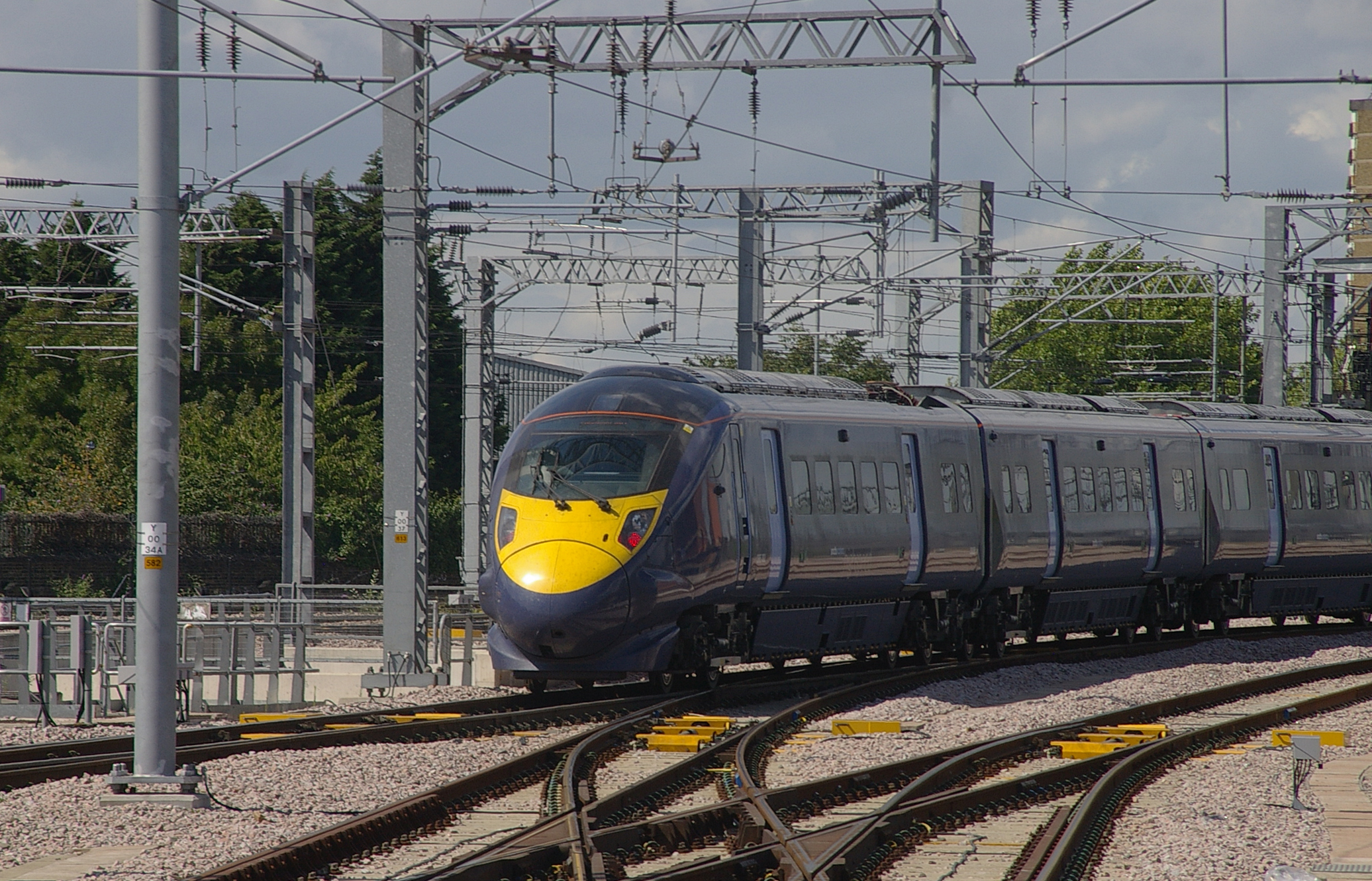
A Southeastern Class 395 train departing from London St Pancras railway station on a preview domestic service

Domestic high-speed services on High Speed 1 are operated by Southeastern. Having been in planning since 2004, a preview service of the British Rail Class 395 trains, popularly known as Javelins, started in June 2009, and regular services began on 13 December 2009. The quickest journey time from Ashford to London St Pancras is 35 minutes, compared with 80 minutes for the service to London Charing Cross via Tonbridge. This service on Section 2 of the CTRL, known previously as CTRL-DS, was a factor in London's successful 2012 Olympic Bid, promising a seven-minute journey time from the Olympic Park at Stratford to the London terminus at St Pancras.

| Class | Image | Type | Top speed | | Number | Routes operated | Built |
| Class | Image | Type | mph | km/h | Number | Routes operated | Built |
|---|---|---|---|---|---|---|---|
| Class 395 | | Electric multiple unit | 140 | 225 | 29 | London–Dover via Ashford International; London–Ramsgate via Faversham; London–Margate via Ashford International | 2007–2009 |

=== DB Cargo UK ===
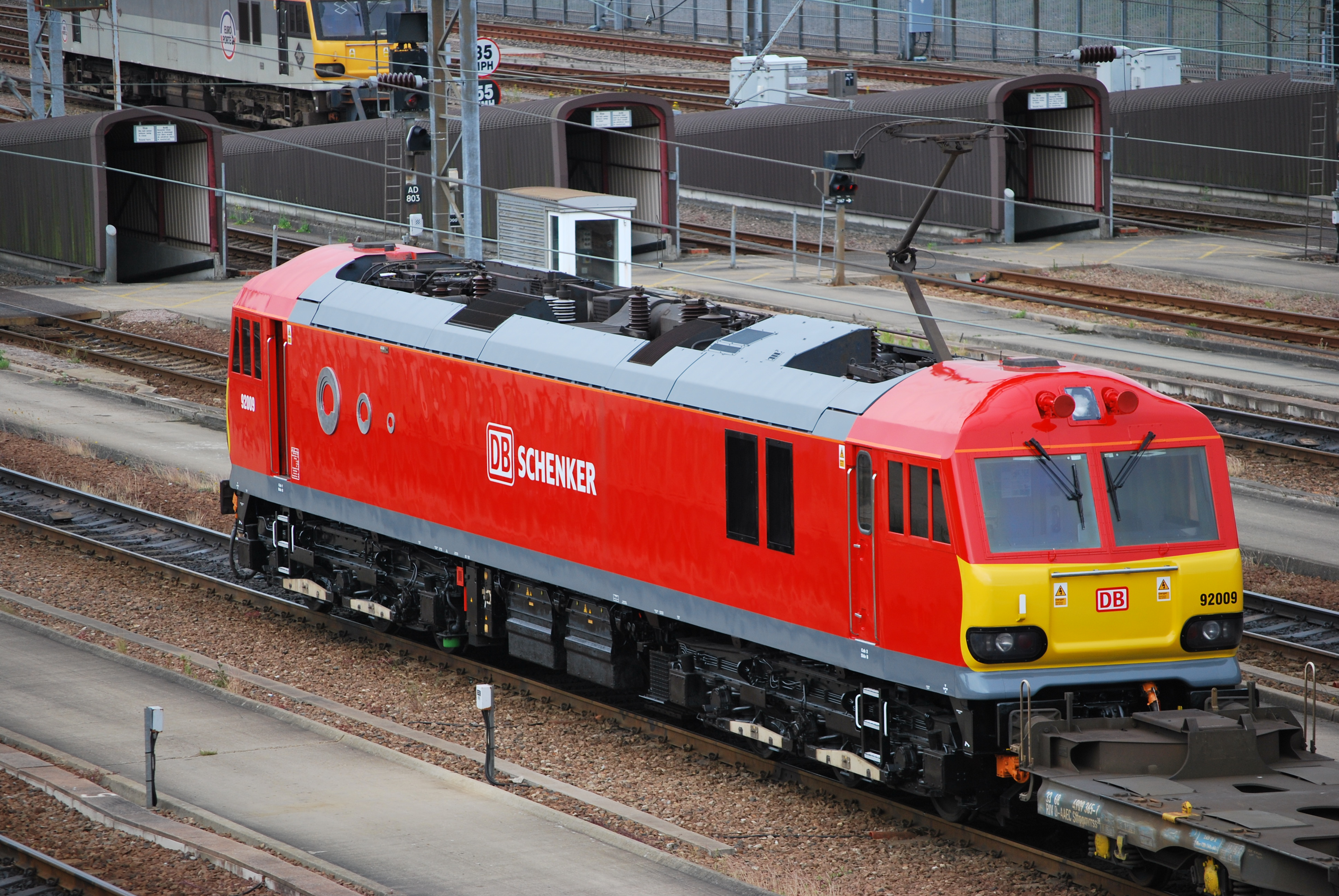
DB Cargo UK Class 92s haul freights over High Speed 1

DB Cargo is a global freight operator with a large interest in freight over rail in Europe. While High Speed 1 was constructed with freight loops, no freight traffic had run upon the line since opening in 2003. On 16 April 2009, DB Schenker signed an agreement with HS1 Ltd, the owner of High Speed 1, for a partnership to develop TVM modifications for class 92 freight locomotives to run on the line. On 25 March 2011, for the first time a modified class 92 locomotive travelled from Dollands Moor to Singlewell using the TVM430 signalling system. A loaded container train ran for the first time on 27 May 2011, to Novara in Italy. Following further trials with loaded wagons DB is to upgrade five Class 92 locomotives to allow them to run on High Speed 1. From 11 November 2011 a weekly service using European-sized swap body containers has run between London and Poland using High Speed 1.

| Class | Image | Type | Top speed | | Number | Built | Notes |
| Class | Image | Type | mph | km/h | Number | Built | Notes |
|---|---|---|---|---|---|---|---|
| Class 92 | | Electric locomotive | 87 | 140 | 46 | 1993–1996 | |

=== Future operations and proposed services ===
Since the liberalisation of European rail in 2010 and subsequent regulatory changes, several operators have proposed international high-speed services via the Channel Tunnel and High Speed 1. Many early proposals did not progress, but renewed interest since 2023 has seen multiple new entrants applying for access rights under ORR oversight.

In 2009, Eurotunnel (the owners of the Channel Tunnel) announced that it was prepared to start relaxing the fire safety regulations, in order to permit other operators to transport passengers via the tunnel using other forms of rolling stock. In March 2010, Eurotunnel, HS1 Ltd, DB and other interested train operators formed a working group to discuss changes to the safety rules, including allowing 200-metre (660 ft) trains. The Intergovernmental Commission (IGC) required trains to be at least 375 m (1,230 ft) long. In June 2011, the IGC decided to allow trains with distributed traction to operate in the Channel Tunnel.

In December 2023, Getlink announced it aimed to double the market for direct high speed trains from the UK over the next ten years. It aimed to reduce the time to market from ten to five years, with services considered including from London to Cologne, Frankfurt, Geneva and Zurich. This would be done through market research, standardising tunnel regulations, introducing tunnel specific criteria into standard rolling stock designs, and working with network operators and stations.

==== Early proposals (2007–2023) ====
In 2009, Veolia Transport (now merged into Transdev) planned to work on proposals in co-operation with Trenitalia to run services from Paris to Strasbourg, London and Brussels.

In August 2018, Bloomberg Businessweek reported that Getlink was interested in setting up an Ouigo-style low cost high speed rail service between London and Paris, travelling between the railway stations of Stratford International and Charles-de-Gaulle.

In March 2020, it was announced that High Speed 1 Ltd, along with SNCF and Lisea, were looking for an operator for a future London St Pancras–Bordeaux St Jean train service.

Heuro, a Dutch rail start up, led by Maarten van den Biggelaar, a Dutch entrepreneur, and his son, announced plans in 2023 to offer 16 services per day from Amsterdam to both London and Paris. It was looking to raise €600 million for the service. It planned to use Zefiro V300 trains, similar to the Frecciarossa 1000.

===== Deutsche Bahn =====
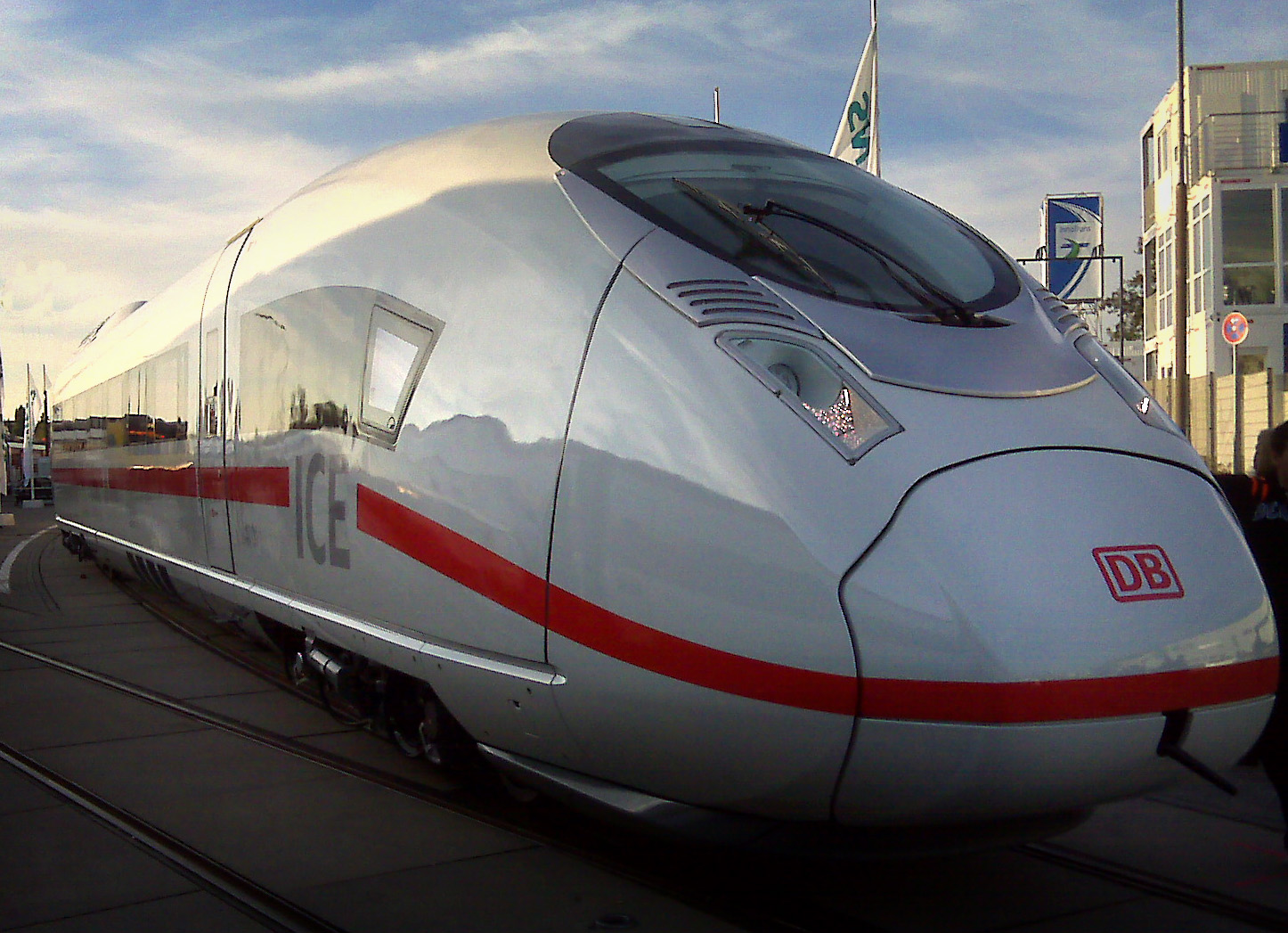
Deutsche Bahn planned services using Siemens Velaro D trains

In November 2007, reports suggested that Deutsche Bahn had applied to operate through the Channel Tunnel and High Speed 1, but both the company and the Channel Tunnel Safety Authority denied any formal application. Progress was hindered by safety regulations, as DB’s ICE 3M trains could not be divided in an emergency.

In December 2008, DB was reported to be interested in acquiring the British share of Eurostar — effectively Eurostar (UK) Ltd., a wholly owned subsidiary of London & Continental Railways (LCR), which the UK government planned to sell. SNCF president Guillaume Pépy described DB’s interest as “premature, presumptuous and arrogant,” while DB denied submitting any official request.

DB carried out evacuation trials in the tunnel on 17 October 2010, with two 200 m long ICE 3 trains, and displayed one of them at St Pancras station on 19 October 2010. The train sets did not meet the fire safety requirements for services through the tunnel, but the Siemens Velaro D sets on order included the necessary additional fire-proofing.

DB planned three services a day to Frankfurt, Rotterdam and Amsterdam via Brussels from 2015, originally targeted for 2013. Delays were caused by the availability of the Channel Tunnel version of the Velaro D trains, high rental costs on the French network, and border-control issues at stations. As of 2016, no services had commenced, though HS1 Ltd continued to reference ongoing collaboration with DB for potential international services.

In March 2017, DB revived plans for a London to Frankfurt train service, with operations expected as early as 2020. The plan was shelved in June 2018 due to a "significantly changed economic environment". In January 2024, DB remarked "transport between London and the mainland through the Eurotunnel remains of fundamental interest to Deutsche Bahn", though noting that the routes and trains were not yet equipped with end-to-end ETCS.

===== Renfe =====
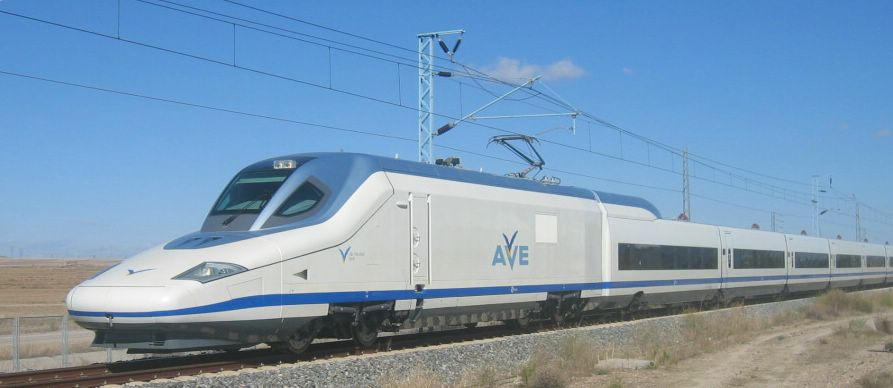
Spanish AVE train

In 2009, Renfe, the Spanish national railway operator expressed interest in operating AVE services from Spain to London via Paris, Lyon, Barcelona, Madrid and Lisbon (using the Madrid–Barcelona high-speed rail line) once its AVE network was connected to France via the Barcelona to Figueres and Perpignan to Figueres lines in 2012.

In October 2021, Renfe announced plans to operate services between Paris and London. Renfe noted additional trains could be feasible along the route, and demand analyses suggested competition with Eurostar would be viable and profitable.

==== 2024–2025 applicants and allocation of Temple Mills capacity ====
The Temple Mills International depot in East London is unique as the only UK facility able to house and maintain European UIC loading gauge trains. This makes it a bottleneck for any new Channel tunnel services. Virgin and Evolyn remarked in November 2024 at an industry event in the Houses of Parliament, that Eurostar had not agreed access to Temple Mills depot. The companies later appealed to the ORR to assess the available capacity. In early 2025, the ORR commissioned an independent report, which confirmed some capacity could be freed up at the depot for additional trains. Eurostar, however, has maintained that Temple Mills is effectively full, warning that only its own planned growth, following an €80 million investment, could be accommodated there.

The ORR formally invited rival operators to submit proposals for Temple Mills access. Four applications were received, submitted between August 2024 and March 2025, from Virgin Trains Europe (VTE), Evolyn Mobility, Gemini Trains and Trenitalia France. On 30 October 2025, the ORR approved Virgin Trains’ application for access to Temple Mills depot, while rejecting applications from Evolyn, Gemini, and Trenitalia. It concluded that Virgin Trains presented the most financially and operationally robust proposal.

===== Evolyn =====
Evolyn, led by the Cosmen family of Spain (the largest shareholder in Mobico) and backed by British and French partners, initially planned to start non-stop services between London and Paris by 2025. It proposed 33 daily services between London, Paris and Brussels. It initially planned to order 12 Avelia Horizon trains from Alstom, depending on securing project financing and regulatory approval.

===== Trenitalia France =====
In April 2025, the Ferrovie dello Stato Italiane Group announced their intention to offer services between London and Paris by 2029, with Frecciarossa branded trains. It signed a memorandum of understanding to explore working in partnership with Evolyn Under Trenitalia France, it proposed 10 daily return services between London and Paris from 2029. Although it uniquely had access to other depots in Europe, access to a British depot was seen to be necessary. It planned to use 10, 202m trains using the design of the Frecciarossa 1000 and manufactured by Hitachi Rail.

===== Gemini Trains =====
In April 2025, Gemini Trains, chaired by Lord Tony Berkeley, announced its plans to offer services from London and Ebbsfleet to Paris and Brussels. It noted Stratford International as being less crowded and as a "blank canvas". In May 2025, Gemini Trains announced plans to co-brand its ten planned trains with Uber, who would also sell tickets through its app, similar to the Thames Clippers services. It aimed to operate 10 daily return services between Stratford International to Paris and Brussels, via Ebbsfleet, from 2029, later increasing to 18 daily return services. It planned to use 10, 202 m Siemens Velaro Novo trains.

===== Virgin Trains Europe =====
As of 2024, the Virgin Group was in the process of exploring whether high speed cross-Channel services would be feasible. Under the name "Project Bullet", it has a capital requirement of £700 million, with Virgin taking a 50% stake, alongside 2 other institutional shareholders. The business will be led by Phil Whittingham, who also ran Virgin Trains West Coast.

Following the March 2025 ORR report, Virgin reported "no more major hurdles" to market entry. It plans to acquire 12, 200 m Avelia Stream trains from Alstom for 20 daily return services, between London and Paris (13), Brussels (4) and Amsterdam (3). After receiving ORR approval to use Temple Mills depot, Virgin Trains intends to begin services by 2030.

== See also ==
- High Speed 2
- Northern Powerhouse Rail (previously called High Speed 3)
- HS4Air
- High-speed rail in the United Kingdom
- Megaproject
- Rail transport in the United Kingdom
- Shortlands railway station (dive-under at Shortlands Junction built in conjunction with HS1)
- Transport in London
- UK Ultraspeed
- Crossings of the River Thames
- Tunnels underneath the River Thames
