= Kit's Coty =

Coordinates: 51.32399°N 0.5034°E

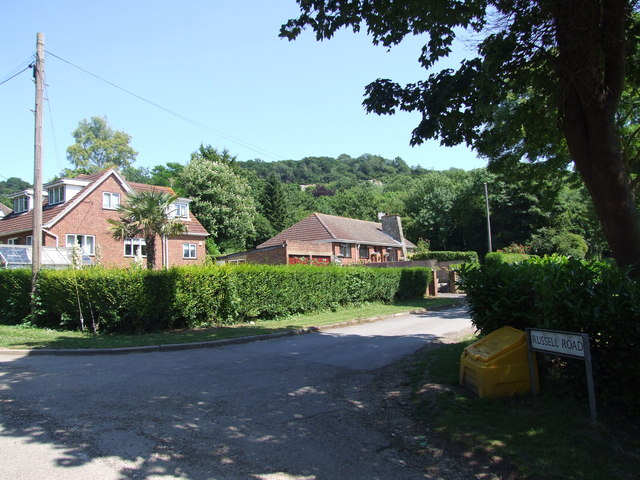

- Location within Kent
- Civil parish: Aylesford
- District: Tonbridge and Malling
- Shire county: Kent
- Region: South East
- Country: England
- Sovereign state: United Kingdom
- Post town: Aylesford
- Postcode district: ME20
- Police: Kent
- Fire: Kent
- Ambulance: South East Coast
- UK Parliament: Chatham and Aylesford

Kit's Coty is a small village on the slopes of Blue Bell Hill between Maidstone and Rochester in the English county of Kent. The population of the village is included in the civil parish of Aylesford.

It is named after the nearby Neolithic chamber tomb of Kit's Coty House and overlooks the valley of the River Medway. The A229 road runs next to the village.
