= Medway Viaducts =

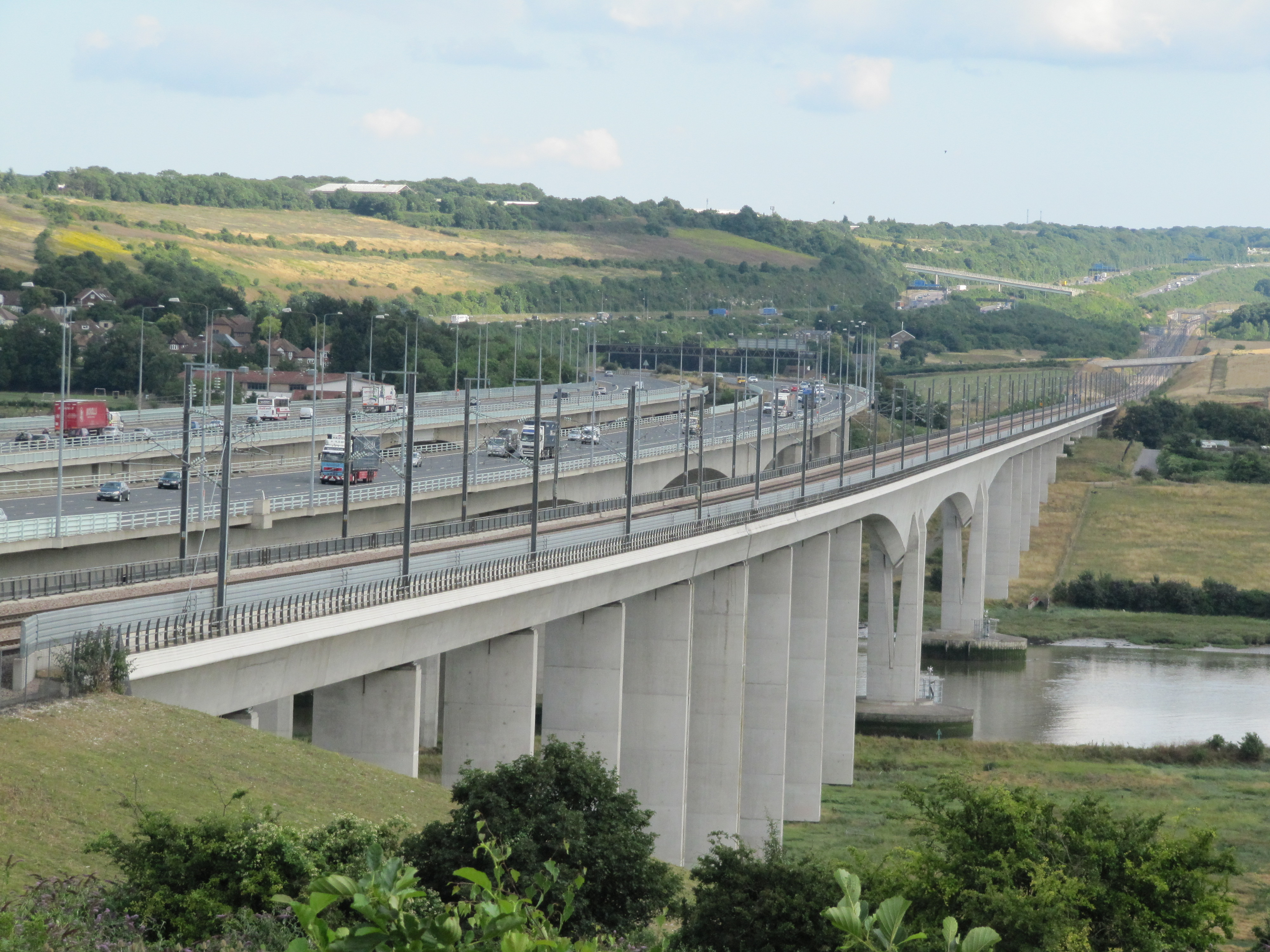
- Coordinates: 51°22′33″N 0°28′32″E
- Carries: Original:4 lanes of M2 plus hard shoulder & Bridleway; New: 4 lanes of M2 plus hard shoulder Rail: 2 tracks of High Speed 1
- Crosses: River Medway
- Locale: Cuxton, England

Characteristics
- Design: Cantilever
- Total length: Original: 997.3 metres (3,272 ft); New: Rail: 1,300 metres (4,265 ft)
- Width: Original: 34.44 metres (113 ft); New: Rail:
- Longest span: Original: 152.4 metres (500 ft); New: Rail:152.4 metres (500 ft)
- Clearance below: Original: 35.5 metres (116 ft) at maximum New: Rail:

History
- Opened: Original: 29 May 1963; New: 2003; Rail: September 2003

Location
- Interactive map of Medway Viaducts

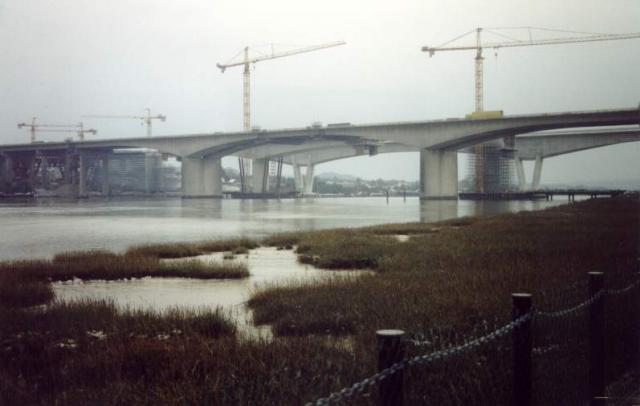
The new viaducts under construction in the early 2000s

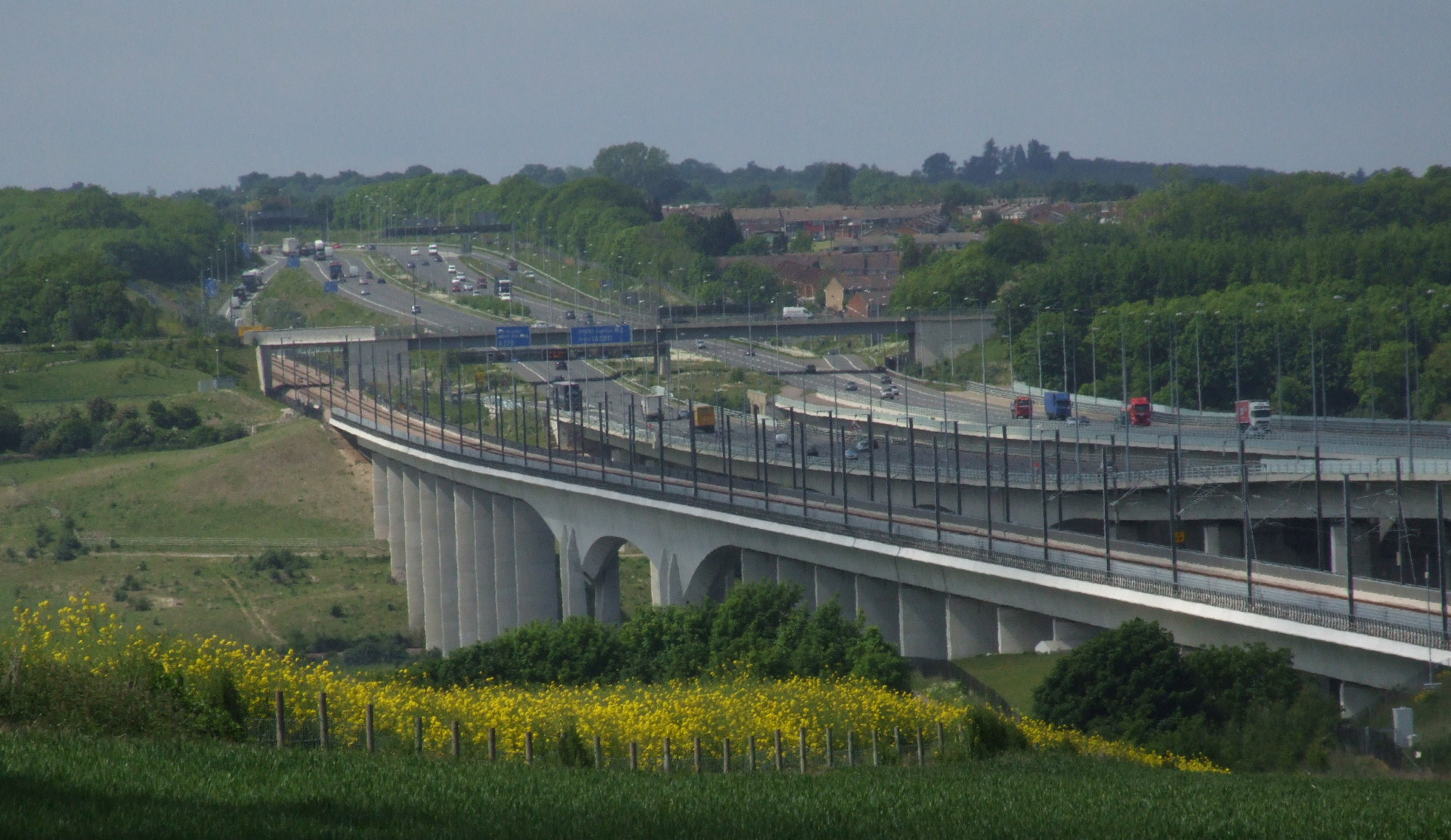
All three bridges seen from the south east bank

The Medway Viaducts are three bridges or viaducts that cross the River Medway between Cuxton and Borstal in north Kent, England. The two road bridges carry the M2 motorway carriageways. The other viaduct carries the High Speed 1 railway line linking London and the Channel Tunnel. All three bridges pass over the Medway Valley Line (to Paddock Wood).

The first Medway Viaduct, built to carry the M2 motorway, opened on 29 May 1963. It remained the only overcrossing of the river on this site until the 2000s, at which point two further bridges were constructed. The second Medway Viaduct was part of the M2 widening scheme, its opening in 2003 enabled the first bridge to be reconfigured to carry coast-bound road traffic only, while the new structure carried the London-bound traffic instead. Other remedial works to the older first bridge were also carried out around this time, including the replacement of its original concrete central span with a steel-braced equivalent.

The third Medway Viaduct was completed in 2002, enabling the High Speed 1 railway line to traverse the river. Its design was somewhat unusual, using V-shaped reinforced concrete piers to support its bridge deck, which was prefabricated in segments and launched into position using hydraulic rams from the abutments; this deck is a cantilever structure. In 2003, a new British rail speed record was achieved by a specially formed Eurostar train which crossed the viaduct at 208 mph (335 km/h). It has also won awards for its novel civil engineering practices.

== Original motorway viaduct ==
Opened on 29 May 1963, by Ernest Marples, the Minister of Transport, the first Medway crossing formed a key element of the new M2 motorway. Built at a cost of £2.5 million, invitations to tender for the bridge's construction were sought in 1959. It consists of three main spans. The largest over the River Medway spans 500 ft, and the other two are 313 ft each. There are seventeen smaller spans of 100 to 135 ft. The construction was carried by a joint venture of Christiani & Nielsen and Kier Group.

As originally built, the first bridge carried a six-lane (two London-bound, two coast-bound, two hard shoulder) formation. In addition, a footpath was present along either side of the road lanes that doubled as a small service road for maintenance personnel and pedestrians alike. These footpaths formed part of the North Downs Way, which offered panoramic views of the Medway Valley and beyond. Central crash barriers were not originally fitted, but were subsequently retrofitted for safety reasons. During the widening of the M2 from two lanes to four, which was undertaken in the late 1990s and early 2000s, the original bridge was subject to extensive refurbishment and strengthening measures. The original central span, which was made from concrete beams, was replaced with steel girders. The concrete beams were broken up on-site using high pressure water-cutting equipment prior to disposal.

Various safety improvements were also implemented across the original bridge, including new steel crash barriers, in late 2006. On 29 May 2013, the M2 celebrated its 50th anniversary. During the summer of 2019, eleven closures of the bridge over the course of three months were necessitated while work to repair multiple bridge joints across the structure was underway.

== Second motorway viaduct ==
Completed during 2003, the second motorway bridge is the newest of the three crossings that traverse the River Medway at this point. It was built as part of the M2 widening project, the structure being located south of the original bridge. Its construction benefited from work to build the adjacent High Speed One railway, such as the reuse of spoil from the North Downs Tunnel to build up the new London-bound road embarkment leading to the bridge.

As a result of the new motorway viaduct's completion, the formation of the M2 motorway crossing was changed; the layout of the original bridge being reordered into three coast-bound lanes, along with a hard shoulder, while both footpaths were reduced in size, including the permanent closure of the south facing footpath, leaving only one path available for pedestrians.

== Railway viaduct ==
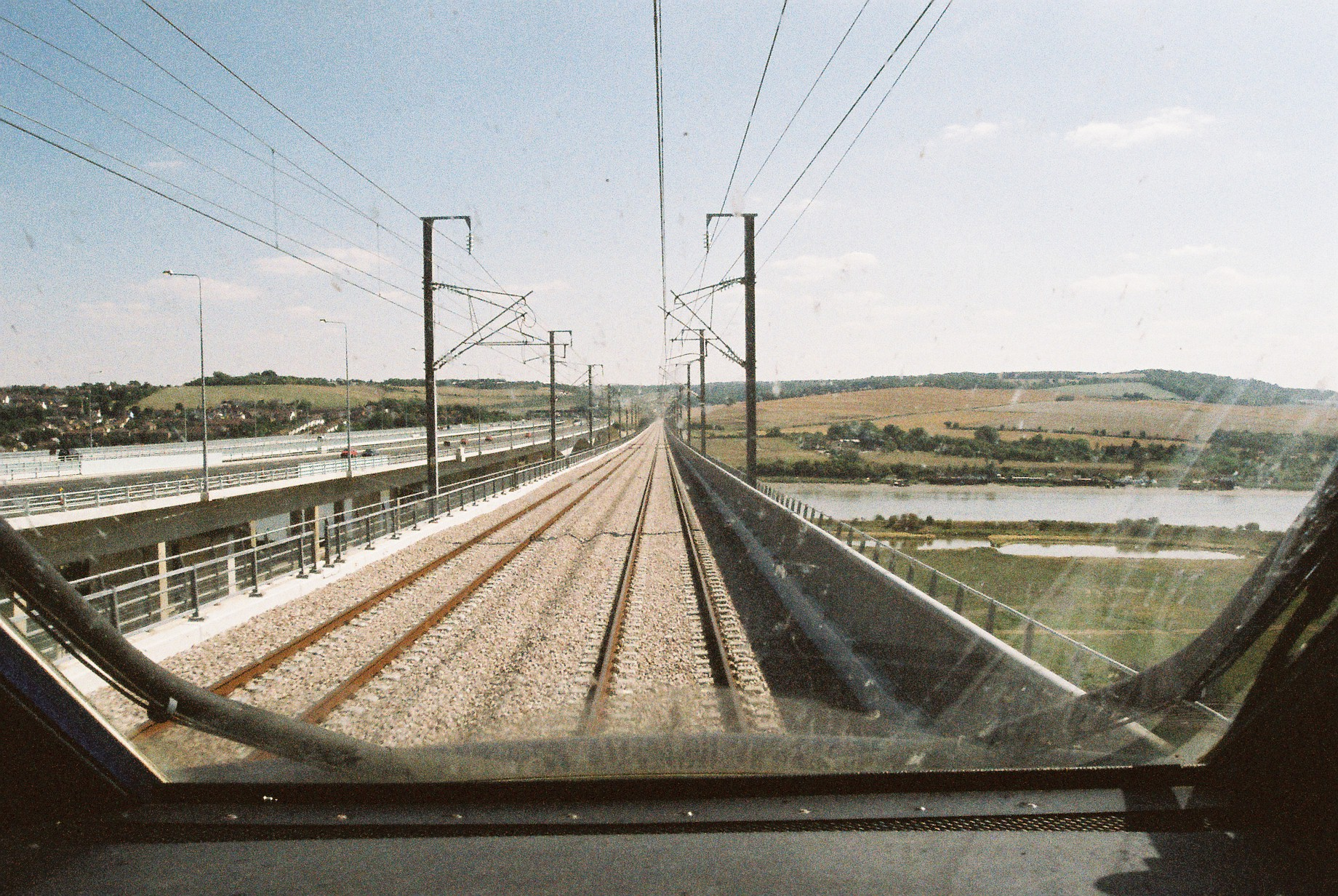
Crossing the Medway rail viaduct, during pre-service testing in 2003

The western bridge carries High Speed 1 (HS1), the high-speed rail link that connects London with the Channel Tunnel.

The rail viaduct is a 1.3 km (0.81 mi) long structure that spans the River Medway, Wouldham Road and Burham Roads in Borstal. It is a multi-span structure, with typical approach spans of 40.5 m (133 ft), while the central navigation span had a length of 152 m (499 ft). On account of the central span having been designed with a balanced cantilever approach, this necessitated the use of certain techniques in its construction, which included the launching of the side spans in an incremental fashion from both the east and west abutments using a series of hydraulic rams. To withstand this, the bridge deck sections were fabricated using bonded prestressing construction; when positioned correctly, these sections cantilever together, aided by external prestressing for its continuity.

The substructure consists of reinforced concrete pier columns that are supported upon bored piles. One distinct feature of the columns is that they are in a "V" shape, which provide greater lateral support and stability, particularly in the event of two high-speed trains deploying their emergency brakes at high speeds while traversing the structure. The structure was designed with several unique features so it could properly accommodate rail movements, including articulation and numerous movement joints. It was also designed to give a broadly similar appearance to the existing viaducts where they run parallel to one another, which includes matching spans and profiles.

In 2003, it was awarded the Concrete Society’s Civil Engineering Category award for "outstanding merit in the use of concrete". A plaque marking this achievement has been attached to one of the upright support legs on the Strood side of the viaduct.

The rail viaduct has been described as being a leading piece of civil engineering for the new line, and has become a prominent symbol of it. On 30 July 2003, a specially formed Eurostar train crossed the viaduct and in to the Nashenden Valley at 208 mph (335 km/h), an occurrence that established a new speed record on the British railway network. In advance of the tenth anniversary of this record-breaking run, a plaque was placed at a nearby vantage point overlooking the railway viaduct.
