= Blue Bell Hill =

Natural feature in Kent, England

Coordinates: 51°20′0″N 0°30′0″E

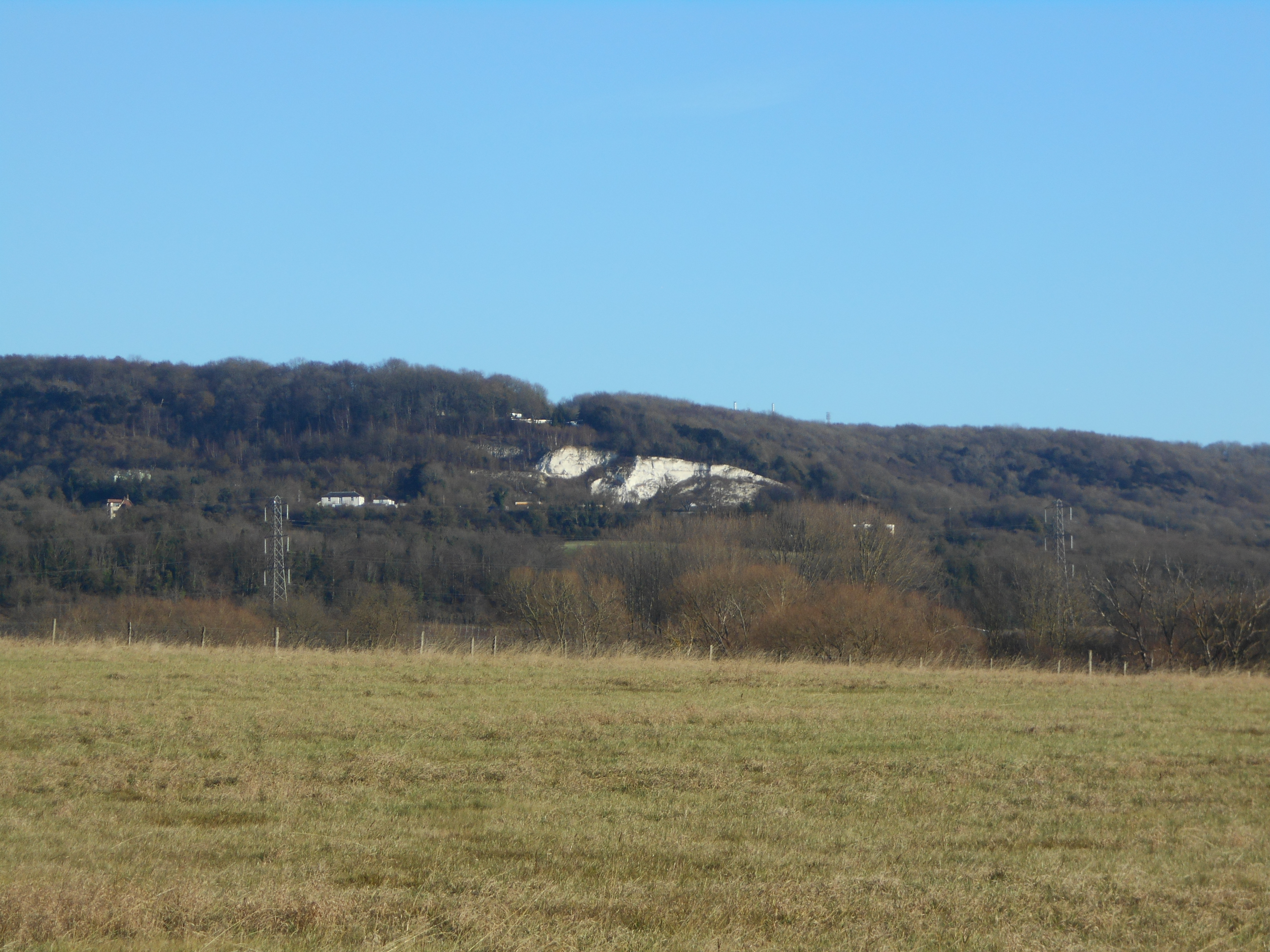
- Interactive map of Blue Bell Hill
- Type: Nature reserve
- Location: Aylesford, Kent
- OS grid: TQ743621
- Area: 5 hectares (12 acres)
- Manager: Kent Wildlife Trust

Blue Bell Hill
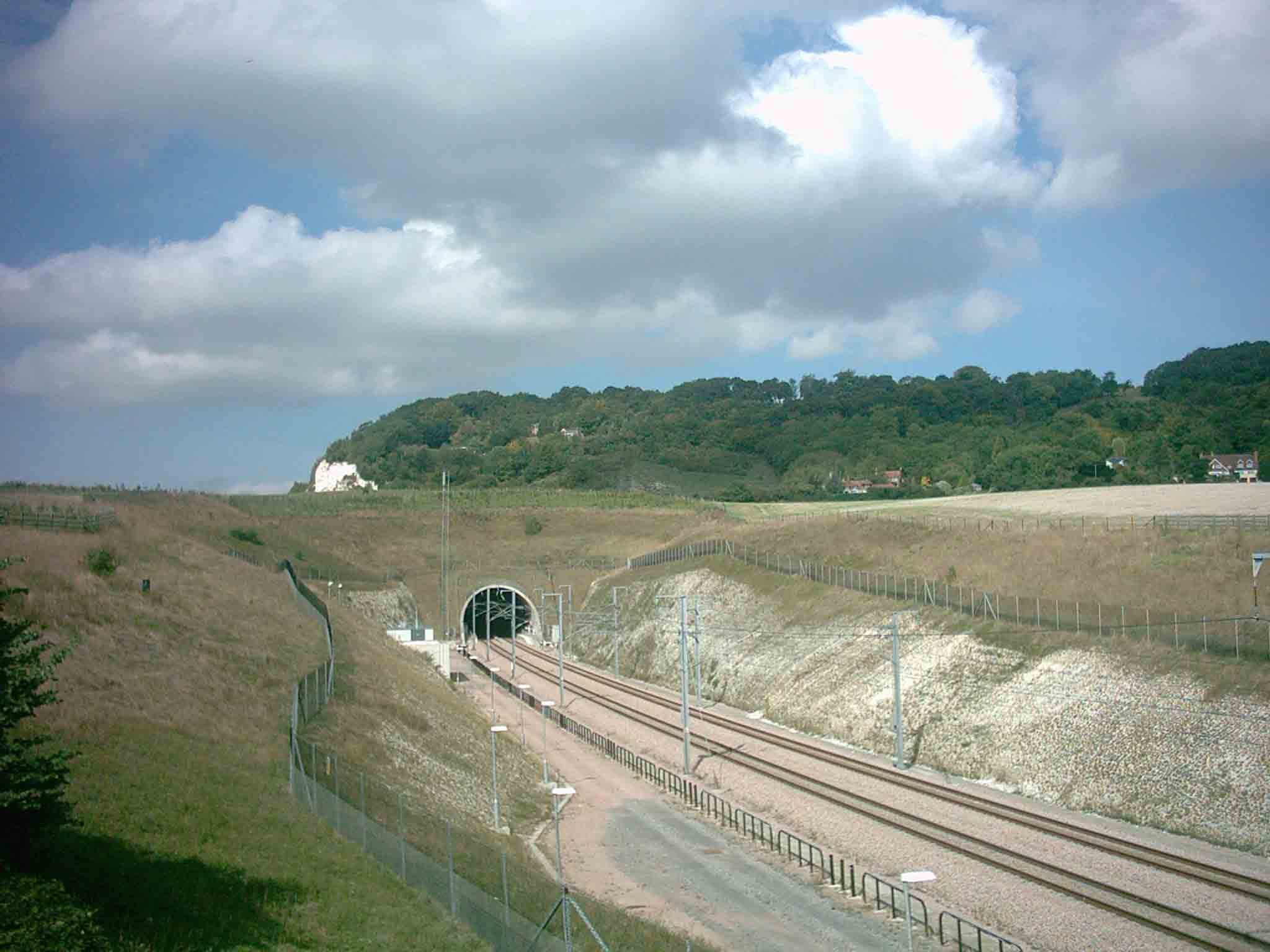
- The High Speed 1 tunnel portal, under the North Downs at Blue Bell Hill

Highest point
- Elevation: 160 m (520 ft)
- Prominence: c. 30 m

Geography
- Location: North Downs, England
- OS grid: TQ740625
- Topo map: OS Landranger 188

Blue Bell Hill is a chalk hill between Maidstone and Rochester in the English county of Kent. It overlooks the River Medway and is part of the North Downs. Settlements on the hill include the Walderslade suburb of Chatham and the villages of Blue Bell Hill and Kit's Coty. During the eighteenth and nineteenth centuries much of the hill was quarried for chalk.

The hill is a 5-hectare (12-acre) nature reserve which is managed by Kent Wildlife Trust. It is also part of the Kent Downs Area of Outstanding Natural Beauty and Wouldham to Detling Escarpment Sites of Special Scientific Interest and is a Nature Conservation Review site, Grade I.

A picnic area serves as a rest point for walkers on the North Downs Way which runs along the top of the hill, whilst the prehistoric trackway of the Pilgrims' Way skirts its foot. A modern crematorium also surmounts the hill.

The A229 dual carriageway follows the route of a former Roman road and climbs the hill, today linking the M2 and M20 motorways. High Speed 1 runs beneath the hill, via the North Downs Tunnel, and archaeological work in advance of it uncovered a Neolithic long house on its slopes. The Bluebell Hill transmitting station is on the hill, as is the Lower Bell pub. The Upper Bell pub was closed around March 2005 due to the reduced demand caused by the closure of a slip-lane onto the southbound A229, and then demolished in 2013.

== Archaeology ==
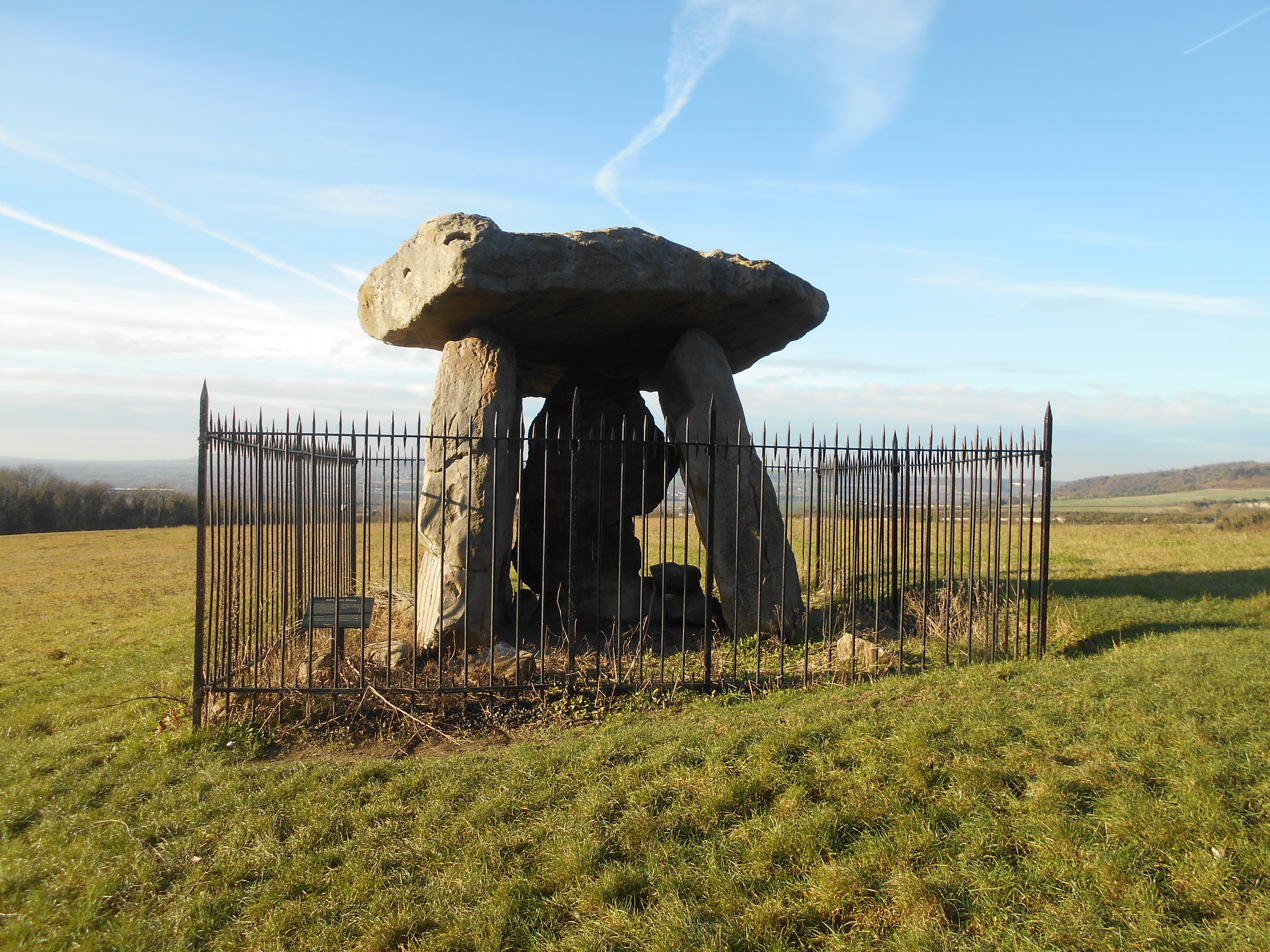
Kit's Coty House chamber tomb on the lower slopes of Blue Bell Hill, with the Medway valley beyond. The earth that once covered it is long since gone.

A famous feature of the hill is the eastern group of the prehistoric tombs called the Medway megaliths including Kit's Coty House and Countless Stones.

The Blue Bell Hill Dolmen was a now lost member of the group of Neolithic chamber tombs in the English county of Kent. It is thought to have been one of the Medway Megaliths. Its precise location is unclear but it stood on Blue Bell Hill on the North Downs between Maidstone and Rochester, to the north of Kit's Coty House. Only fragments of antiquarians' records now remain. It was possibly investigated in 1844 and was still extant in the early twentieth century. A sketch in Maidstone Museum indicates that three sarsen standing stones survived to heights of 7 feet forming the walls of the burial chamber. A stone that may have formed the capstone lay between them. The tomb was found to have contained the skeleton of a man and fragments of red pottery were found although none of these has since survived. A kerb of smaller stones surrounded the larger ones and beneath the standing stones was a large circular pit dug into the natural chalk and filled with many flints. Local people told the investigating antiquarians that many such pits had been found on the hill and that the flints were used as a source of stone to metal new roads. From these fragments it is thought that one, or possibly more, chamber tombs stood on Blue Bell Hill in addition to the surviving Medway Megaliths.

Remains of a Roman building containing human remains and traces of burnt wood had been excavated near to Kit's Coty. They are claimed to be the ruins of a Roman temple to have been built on the hill later.
