= Phil Whittingham =

Phil Whittingham (born 24 February 1971)

After training with KPMG in Birmingham, Whittingham joined Virgin Trains West Coast in August 1999, becoming Finance Director in January 2008 and managing director in January 2015. In December 2019, Whittingham became managing director of Avanti West Coast .
