= Eurostar Group =

European rail company

- Type: Private
- Industry: High-speed rail service
- Founded: 7 April 2022; 4 years ago
- Headquarters: Saint-Gilles, Belgium
- Area served: Belgium; France; Germany; Netherlands; United Kingdom
- Key people: Gwendoline Cazenave (CEO)
- Services: Eurostar
- Revenue: €2.0bn (2025)
- Owner: SNCF Voyageurs (55.75%); CDPQ (19.31%); NMBS/SNCB (18.5%); Federated Hermes Infrastructure (6.44%)
- Subsidiaries: Eurostar International Limited; THI Factory
- Website: www.eurostar.com

Eurostar Group is the parent holding company of the Eurostar high-speed rail service. It wholly owns Eurostar International Limited (EIL), which operates Eurostar services via the Channel Tunnel, and THI Factory (THIF), which operates Eurostar services within continental Europe. Eurostar Group is majority-owned by SNCF Voyageurs and is based in Brussels, Belgium.

== History ==
=== Background ===
==== Eurostar International Limited ====
When trans-channel Eurostar services began on 14 November 1994, they were operated as a joint venture by SNCF, NMBS/SNCB, and European Passenger Services (EPS), a subsidiary of British Rail.

In 1996, the privatisation of British Rail saw ownership of EPS transferred to London and Continental Railways (LCR), a private consortium which had won the contract to build and operate the Channel Tunnel Rail Link (later known as High Speed 1). LCR renamed EPS as Eurostar (UK) Limited, and intended to use Eurostar revenue to help finance the construction of the rail link. However, patronage underperformed expectations, and LCR required bailouts which brought it under the control of the British Government.

In 2010, Eurostar (UK) Limited was renamed Eurostar International Limited (EIL), and agreement was reached between the three national Eurostar operators to combine trans-channel Eurostar operations under it. Once all Eurostar assets were transferred to EIL, the holdings in the company were amended to SNCF (55%), LCR (40%), and NMBS/SNCB (5%).

In 2014, the British Government transferred LCR's 40% stake in EIL to HM Treasury to enable its sale. The following year, the shareholding was sold to the Caisse de dépôt et placement du Québec (CDPQ) (30%) and Hermes Infrastructure (10%) for £760m.

==== THI Factory ====
From June 1996, NMBS/SNCB and SNCF began jointly operating passenger rail services between Belgium and France, and later into Germany and the Netherlands, under the brand name Thalys. The service was managed by Thalys International (initially named Westrail International), a Belgian cooperative society with limited liability which was 70% owned by SNCF and 30% owned by NMBS/SNCB.

In 2007, Deutsche Bahn (DB) bought into Thalys International with a 10% stake, causing the SNCF and NMBS/SNCB shareholdings to be recalculated to 62% and 28% respectively. DB announced its exit from Thalys in 2013.

Following DB's departure, a Belgian public limited company named THI Factory (THIF) was established by SNCF and NMBS/SNCB with a 60:40 shareholding split respectively. In March 2015, THIF took over direct operation of Thalys from the national operators.

In February 2022, Thalys International was absorbed into THIF.

=== Formation ===
In September 2019, it was reported that EIL and THIF shareholders were pursuing a plan to merge the two companies, both majority owned by SNCF, as part of a project dubbed Green Speed. Both companies were already operating in France, Belgium, and the Netherlands, with EIL also operating Eurostar services in the United Kingdom, and THIF also operating Thalys services in Germany. Stated aims of the merger were to reduce costs and provide a more seamless experience to passengers, with the use of a single ticketing system and loyalty program. The proposal was criticised by the European Passengers’ Federation, who believed that the merger would give the new company a monopoly position and lead to higher ticket prices for passengers.

After being delayed by the COVID-19 pandemic, the merger project resumed in October 2021. It was announced that both services would be operated under the Eurostar brand, while the Thalys brand was to be dropped, with EIL's existing Eurostar service described as Eurostar Blue and THIF's existing Thalys service described as Eurostar Red.

The European Commission approved the planned merger on 29 March 2022. In April 2022, the new holding company, Eurostar Group, was established in Belgium as a public limited company, and full ownership of both EIL and THIF was transferred to it. Ownership of Eurostar Group was split between the previous shareholders of EIL and THIF, with SNCF retaining its majority stake.

== Passenger numbers and financial results ==
In January 2024, Eurostar Group announced that its passenger numbers in 2023 are back to pre-Covid levels, as total passenger numbers reached 18.9 million in 2023, a 22% increase from 2022 numbers. Eurostar Group's stated target is to reach 30 million passengers by 2030.

Yearly passengers and financial results
| Year | Passengers (million) | YOY change | Revenue | EBITDA |
|---|---|---|---|---|
| 2022 | 15.3 | | €1.59bn | €392m |
| 2023 | 18.6 | ▲ +22% | €2bn | €423m |
| 2024 | 19.5 | ▲ +5% | €2.0bn | €346m |
| 2025 | 20 | ▲ +3% | €2.0bn | €337m |
