= North Downs Tunnel =

Railway tunnel in Kent, England

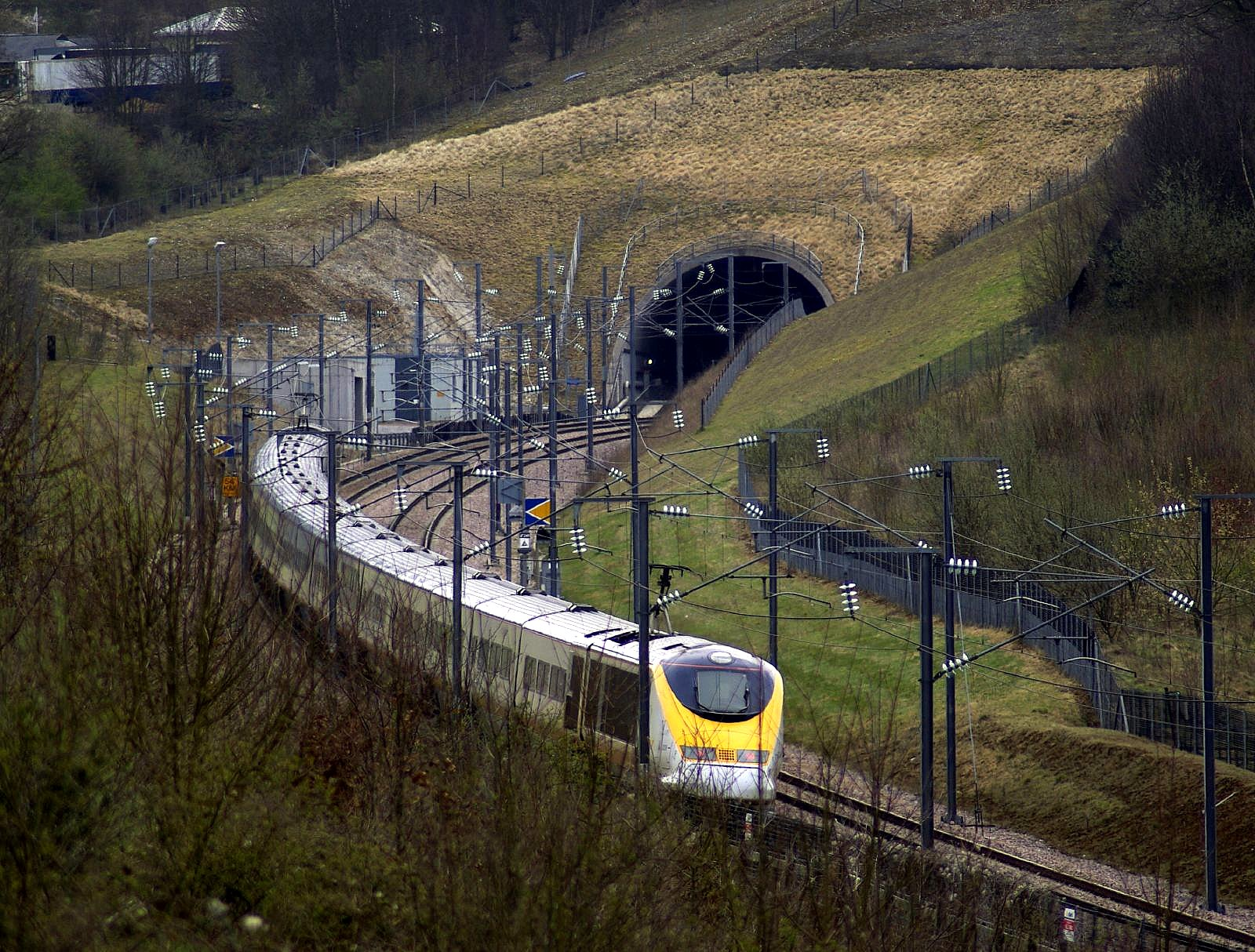
- North portal, with Class 373 on Eurostar service heading to Paris
- Interactive map of North Downs Tunnel

Overview
- Other name: Blue Bell Hill Tunnel
- Line: High Speed 1
- Location: Blue Bell Hill, Maidstone, Kent
- Coordinates: 51°19′44″N 0°30′21″E

Operation
- Work began: 1999
- Opened: 2003
- Owner: Network Rail

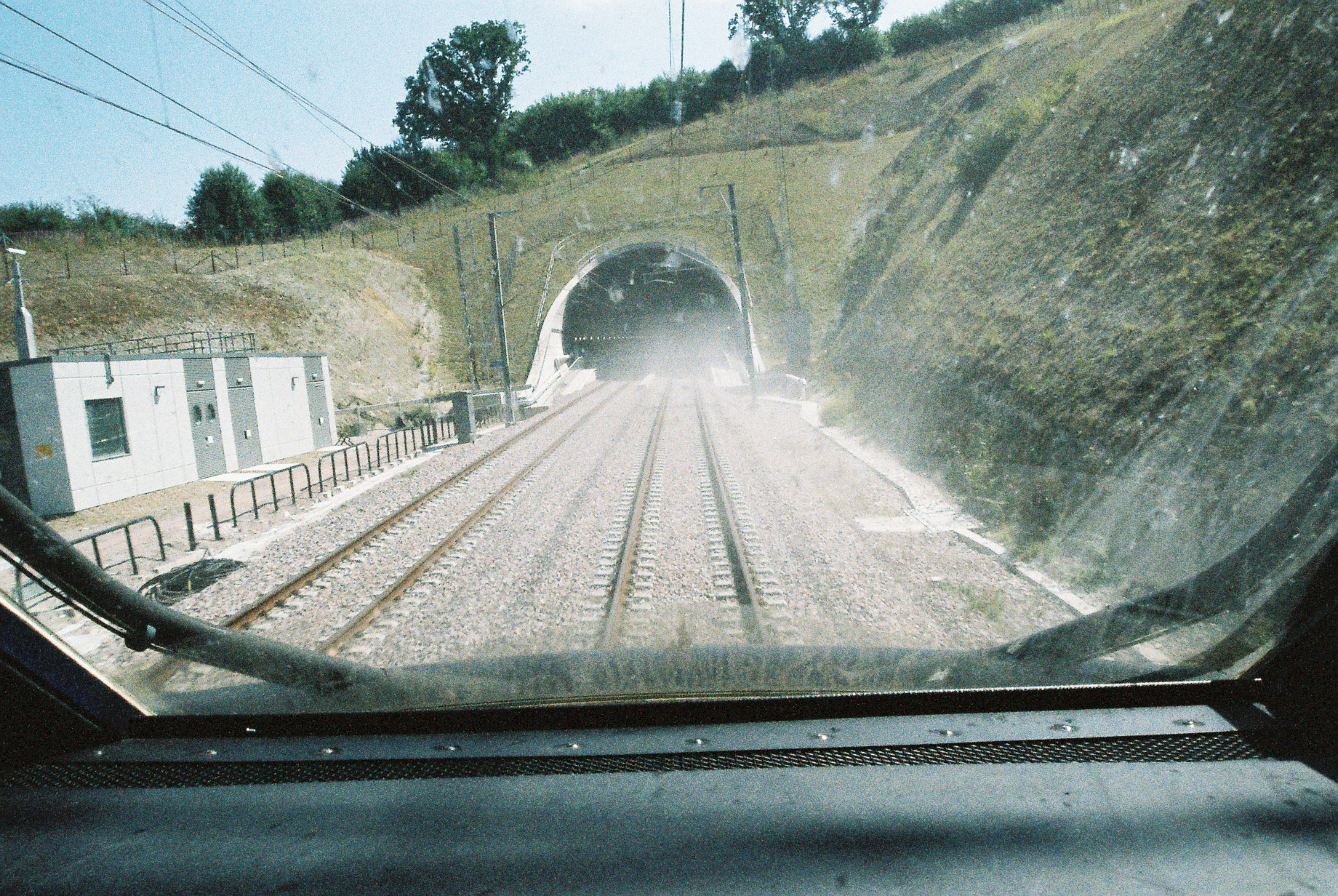
North portal, dust whipped up by a test train before opening in 2003

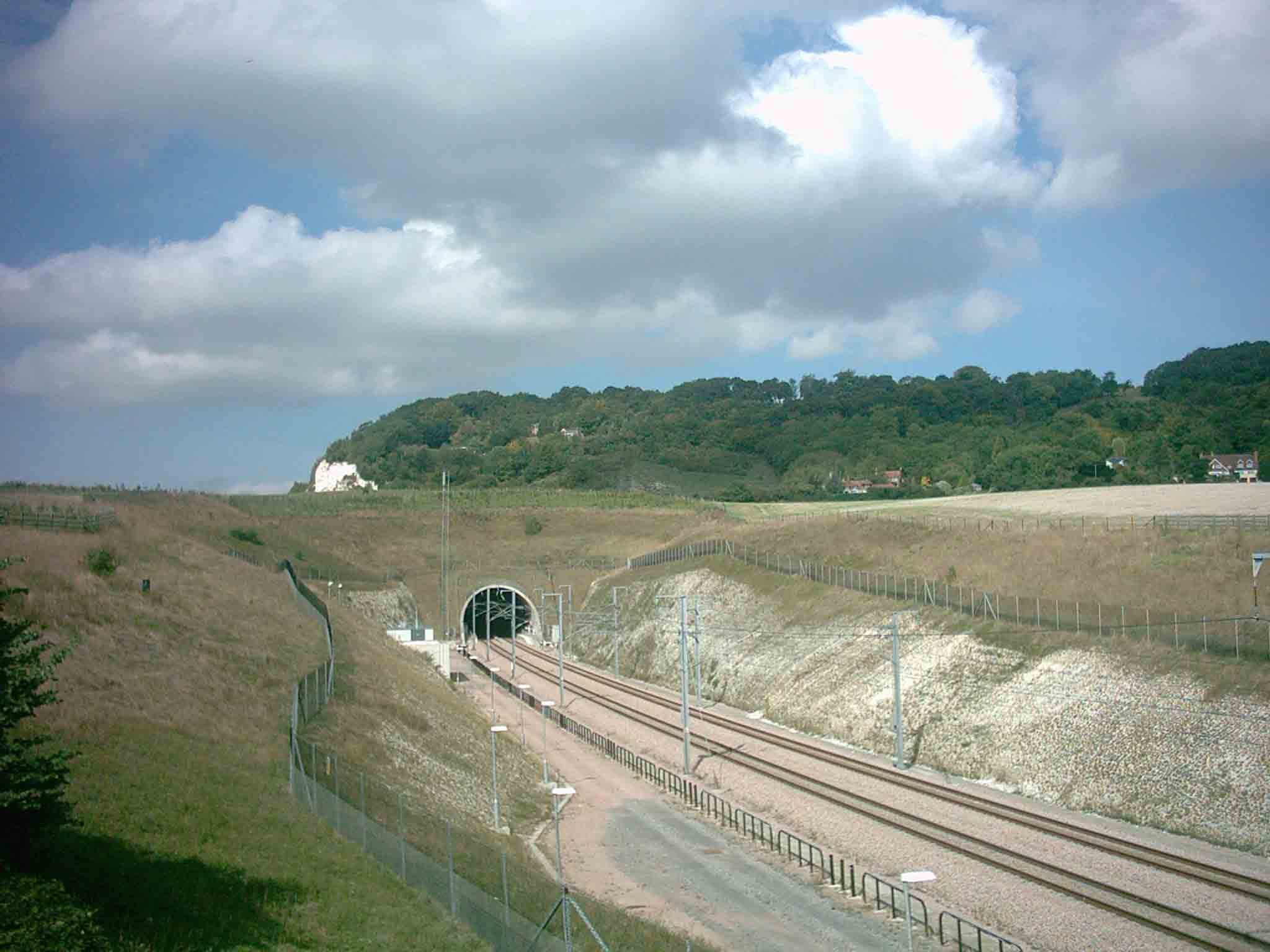
South portal, leading under the North Downs at Blue Bell Hill

The North Downs Tunnel, also known as the Blue Bell Hill Tunnel, is a railway tunnel that carries High Speed 1 through the North Downs, at Blue Bell Hill near Maidstone in Kent, south-east England.

The tunnel is 3.2 kilometres (2 mi) long, with an internal diameter of 12 metres (40 ft) and a cross-sectional area (CSA) of 150 square metres, and descends to a depth of 100 m (325 ft) below the chalk hills. Thus, at the time of its completion, the North Downs Tunnel was both the largest (in terms of CSA) and deepest twin-track railway tunnel to have ever been constructed in the UK. Trains using High Speed 1 can reach 300 kilometres per hour (186 mph) whilst in the tunnel.

== Construction ==
The North Downs Tunnel was constructed as one element of the first phase of the Channel Tunnel Rail Link (CTRL), which was subsequently rebranded as High Speed 1. Its north-west portal, the nearest to London, is positioned at the head of the Nashenden Valley while the south-facing portal emerges at the base of Bluebell Hill. At the time of its completion, the tunnel was reportedly regarded as being one of the largest railway tunnels to be constructed in Europe as well as the largest and deepest tunnel in the UK, possessing a length of 3.2km and an excavated cross section of up to 174 square m (13m diameter). A key reason for the larger than normal cross section was a result of environmental sensitivity having prevented the construction of any conventional pressure relief shafts for the tunnel, thus necessitating alternative means for handling the pressure waves generated by high speed trains.

Much of the tunnel's planning and construction was performed by Arup Group. The tender was subject to considerable revision, which had been attributed with generating a 15% reduction in costs incurred. Responsibility for the design and project management of the tunnel lay with a multidisciplinary team of engineers that specialising in civil engineering, geotechnical, tunneling, environmental, rail operations, and safety engineers. Particularly attention was paid to the North Downs Tunnel's construction, as it had been recognised from the onset of efforts to construct the CTRL that the tunnel was a potentially major risk area that could disrupt the wider programme. It was considered to be the only major tunnel along the first half of the CTRL.

The geology that the tunnel was bored through is largely dominated by relatively weak chalk beds. Extensive surveys were performed, including a series of boreholes, which helped build a wider understanding of the material in general. Planners decided that, unlike any of the other tunnels that were constructed along the CTRL, the construction of the North Downs Tunnel would use the modern techniques of the New Austrian Tunnelling method (NATM); in accordance with these method, the application of a sprayed concrete lining followed immediately after the mechanical excavation. Throughout the construction process, continuous monitoring was practiced to track both settlement and any ground deformations that occurred.

In June 2000, breakthrough, a key milestone in the tunnel's construction, was achieved; at this point, the work was reportedly two months ahead of schedule. One of the changes made during construction was the application of the secondary tunnel lining, composed of reinforced concrete; after testing revealed the overlying chalk to be stiffer than had been predicted by earlier surveys, it was recognised that less additional strength would be required to meet the required standards, thus the thickness of this secondary lining was reduced.

During December 2001, it was announced that construction of the tunnel had been completed; which was five months ahead of schedule while also being £5 million under budget. This outcome, being better than anticipated, has been attributed to a combination of technical innovation, value engineering and an integrated observational approach that was practiced during the programme. Over 100 workers working in shifts 24 hours a day made this possible, despite the site being perceived as a major risk before the project.
