= List of tunnels in the United Kingdom =

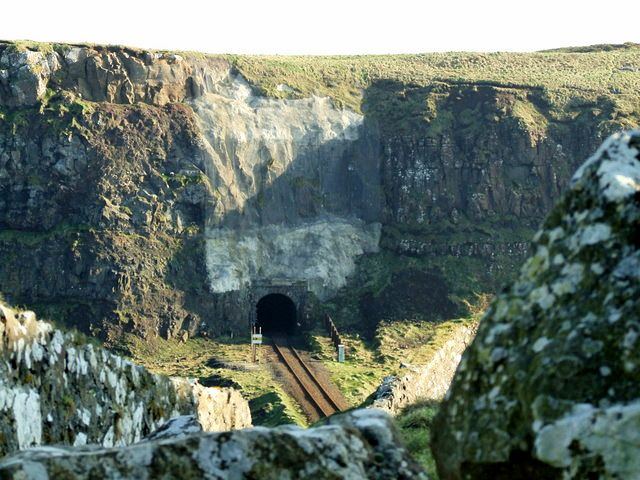
Downhill Railway Tunnels near Castlerock on the NIR network.

This is a list of road, railway, waterway, and other tunnels in the United Kingdom.

A tunnel is an underground passageway with no defined minimum length, though it may be considered to be at least twice as long as wide. Some government bodies define a tunnel as 150 metres (0.093 mi) in length or longer.

A tunnel may be for pedestrians or cyclists, for general road traffic, for motor vehicles only, for rail traffic, or for a canal. Some are aqueducts, constructed purely for carrying water—for consumption, for hydroelectric purposes or as sewers—while others carry other services such as telecommunications cables. There are even tunnels designed as wildlife crossings for European badgers and other endangered species.

The longest tunnel in the United Kingdom is the Northern line at 27,800 metres (91,200 ft). This will be superseded in the 2030s by the 37,600-metre (123,400 ft) Woodsmith Mine Tunnel in North Yorkshire that will transport polyhalite from North Yorkshire to a port on Teesside. Standedge Tunnel at 5,029 metres (3.125 mi) is the longest canal tunnel in the United Kingdom. When completed in the late 2020s, the Chiltern tunnel will be the 2nd longest mainline railway tunnel in the UK at 16,040 metres (52,620 ft).

== England ==
Location	Tunnel	Type	Length		Construction method / Notes	Date of opening	Coordinates
Location	Tunnel	Type	(m)	(yd)	Construction method / Notes	Date of opening	Coordinates
Bedfordshire	Ampthill Tunnel	Railway	654	715	4 tracks in 2 bores	1859	52.03361°N 0.51333°W
Bedfordshire	Linslade Tunnel	Railway	249	272	4 tracks in 3 bores	1837, 1859, 1876	51.92544°N 0.67611°W
Bedfordshire	Old Warden Tunnel	Railway	807	883	Brick construction, Carried the Bedford to Hitchin line	1853	52.08835°N 0.37581°W
Bedfordshire	Wymington Tunnel	Railway	1,690	1,850	Also known as Sharnbrook Tunnel, allows freight trains to avoid the gradients over Sharnbrook summit (elevation 315 feet)	1859	52.25166°N 0.58266°W
Bristol	Clifton Down Tunnel	Railway	1,601	1,751	Part of the Clifton Extension Railway built jointly by the MR and GWR	1874	51.46720°N 2.62531°W
Buckinghamshire	Brill Tunnel	Railway	175	191	Great Western Railway, now Chiltern Main Line	1910	
Buckinghamshire	Whitehouse Tunnel	Railway	322	352	Chiltern Main Line	1905	
Cambridgeshire	Wansford Tunnel	Railway	563	616	Now on preserved Nene Valley Railway	1847	52.56518°N 0.39956°W
Cheshire & Greater Manchester	Disley Tunnel	Railway	3,535	3,865	Bored tunnel	1901	53.37172°N 2.08576°W
Cheshire	Preston Brook Tunnel	Canal	1,133	1,239		1775	
Cheshire	Prestbury Tunnel	Railway	250	273	Brick	1845	53.29551°N 2.14447°W
Cheshire	Sutton Tunnel	Railway	1,724	1,885	See also Sutton Tunnel railway accident	1848	53.32020°N 2.67790°W
Cornwall	Saltash Tunnel	Road	410	448	Carries the A38	1988	50.41161°N 4.21496°W
Cornwall	Brownqueen Tunnel	Railway	80	88		1859	50.43466°N 4.68092°W
Cornwall	Toldish Tunnel	Railway	460	500	Used by horse-drawn trams, closed 1874	1849	50.40311°N 4.92533°W
Cornwall	Trelill Tunnel	Railway	304	333	Disused (closed 1966)	1895	50.56886°N 4.76268°W
Cornwall	Shillingham Tunnel	Railway	412	451	aka Wivelscombe	1908	50.39539°N 4.26427°W
Cornwall	Treverrin Tunnel	Railway	516	564		1859	50.38281°N 4.67616°W
Cornwall	Polperro Tunnel	Railway	348	381		1859	50.28615°N 5.01136°W
Cornwall	Buckshead Tunnel	Railway	290	320		1859	50.27936°N 5.04071°W
Cornwall	Sparnick Tunnel	Railway	449	491		1863	50.24026°N 5.09462°W
Cornwall	Pinnock Tunnel	Railway	1,073	1,173	Now converted to private road	1874	50.35125°N 4.66219°W
County Durham	Shildon Tunnel	Railway	1,120	1,120	Single track	1842	54.636°N 1.645°W
Cumbria	Rise Hill Tunnel	Railway	1,109	1,109	Double track	1875	54.297°N 2.360°W
Cumbria	Whitehaven Tunnel	Railway	1,219	1,333	Single track, bore widened 1958	1852	54.45200°N 3.58200°W
Derbyshire	Alfreton Tunnel	Railway	770	840		1862	53.09200°N 1.36136°W
Derbyshire	Ashbourne Tunnel	Railway	350	383	Now a cycleway	1899	53.01571°N 1.73483°W
Derbyshire	Bolsover Tunnel	Railway	2,399	2,624	Infilled with coal waste 1966-7	1897	53.21662°N 1.27669°W
Derbyshire	Bradway Tunnel	Railway	1,853	2,026		1870	53.31721°N 1.49813°W
Derbyshire	Breadsall Tunnel (also Morley)	Railway	218	238		1878	52.95597°N 1.40889°W
Derbyshire	Burbage Tunnel	Railway	530	580		1830	53.26168°N 1.95300°W
Derbyshire	Butterley Tunnel	Canal	2,712	2,966	Disused canal	1794	53.05936°N 1.39487°W
Derbyshire	Chee Tor Tunnel (1)	Railway	390	430		1863	53.25584°N 1.81063°W
Derbyshire	Chee Tor Tunnel (2)	Railway	86	94		1863	53.25468°N 1.81452°W
Derbyshire	Clay Cross Tunnel	Railway	1,631	1,784	Brick	1839	53.16790°N 1.41363°W
Derbyshire	Cowburn Tunnel	Railway	3,385	3,702		1892	53.35200°N 1.86680°W
Derbyshire	Cressbrook Tunnel	Railway	431	471		1863	53.24949°N 1.74688°W
Derbyshire	Dove Holes Tunnel	Railway	2,729	2,984	Closed to passenger traffic in 1967	1865	53.30293°N 1.88853°W
Derbyshire	Duckmanton Tunnel	Railway	458	501	Closed to passenger traffic in 1951, closed completely 1957, infilled 1970s	1897	53°13′44.2″N 1°22′1.3″W
Derbyshire	Eaves Tunnel	Railway	394	431		1863	
Derbyshire	Great Rocks Tunnel	Railway	147	161		1863	
Derbyshire	Haddon Tunnel	Railway	967	1,058	Constructed with cut and cover methods, closed in 1967	1863	53.19644°N 1.65207°W
Derbyshire	Headstone Tunnel	Railway	487	533		1863	
Derbyshire	High Tor Tunnel 1	Railway	294	321		1849	
Derbyshire	High Tor Tunnel 2	Railway	346	378		1849	
Derbyshire	Holt Lane Tunnel	Railway	115	126		1849	
Derbyshire	Hopton Tunnel	Railway	103	113		1830	
Derbyshire	Hindlow Tunnel	Railway	470	514	Now a cycleway	1832	
Derbyshire	Hollingwood Common Tunnel	Canal	2,820	3,080	Disused coalmine canal joining with Chesterfield Canal	1777	
Derbyshire	Lea Wood Tunnel	Railway	288	315		1849	
Derbyshire	Litton Tunnel	Railway	472	516		1863	53.25204°N 1.75534°W
Derbyshire	Mickleover Tunnel	Railway	424	464		1878	
Derbyshire	Milford Tunnel	Railway	782	855		1839	53.00177°N 1.48672°W
Derbyshire	Morley Tunnel	Railway	218	238		1878	
Derbyshire	New Mills Tunnel	Railway	112	123		1867	
Derbyshire	Norwood Tunnel	Canal	2,637	2,884	Collapsed 1907	1775	W. 53.33253°N 1.28921°W; C. 53.33501°N 1.26971°W, E. 53.33744°N 1.25022°W
Derbyshire	Norwood End Tunnel No. 10	Railway	270	300	Parallel to Norwood Tunnel	1878	
Derbyshire	Pic Tor Tunnel	Railway	175	191		1863	
Derbyshire	Redhill Tunnel 1	Railway	141	154		1839	
Derbyshire	Redhill Tunnel 2	Railway	160	170		1839	
Derbyshire	Rowthorn Tunnel	Railway	849	929	Closed 1930	1890	
Derbyshire	Rusher Cutting Tunnel	Railway	111	121		1863	
Derbyshire	Shirland Tunnel	Railway	173	189			
Derbyshire	Spinkhill Tunnel	Railway	458	501	Closed 9 January 1967 and subsequently lifted	1897	
Derbyshire	Toadmoor Tunnel	Railway	118	129		1839	
Derbyshire & Yorkshire – South	Totley Tunnel	Railway	5,700	6,230		1892	
Derbyshire	Whatstandwell Tunnel	Railway	136	149		1849	
Derbyshire	Whitwell Tunnel	Railway	497	544			
Derbyshire	Willersley Tunnel	Railway	699	764		1849	
Derbyshire	Wingfield Tunnel	Railway	239	261		1839	
Devon	Aller Tunnel	Railway	270	295	Built using 110 concrete bridge beams, A380 passes overhead	2014	
Devon	Dainton Tunnel	Railway	266	291		1847	
Devon	Devonport Leat Tunnel	Leat	500	547		1790s	
Devon	Marley Tunnel	Railway	795	869			
Devon	Parson's Tunnel	Railway	554	606	Known for the Legend of the Parson and Clerk		
Dorset	Beaminster Tunnel	Road	105	115	Carries the A3066, brick lined construction, one of the oldest road tunnels still in use	1832	
Dorset	Buckhorn Weston Tunnel	Railway	678	742			
Dorset	Bincombe Tunnel (North)	Railway	749	819			
Dorset	Evershot Tunnel	Railway	282	308			
Dorset	Frampton Tunnel	Railway	595	651			
Dorset	Middlebere Plateway Tunnels	Railway			Built in two stages	1807, 1825	
Dorset	Poundbury Tunnel	Railway	244	267		1857	
East Sussex	Cuilfail Tunnel	Road	430	470	Carries the A26, built to ease traffic congestion in Lewes	1980	
East Sussex	Bopeep Tunnel	Railway	1,205	1,318		1846	
East Sussex	Crowborough Tunnel	Railway	935	1,022		1868	
East Sussex	Culver Tunnel	Railway	227	289	Closed 1958	1882	
East Sussex	Falmer Tunnel	Railway	450	490		1846	
East Sussex	Hastings Tunnel	Railway	700	770		1846	
East Sussex	Heathfield Tunnel	Railway	242	265	Closed 1965, now cycleway & footpath	1880	
East Sussex	Lewes Tunnel	Railway	362	396		1847	
East Sussex	Mountfield Tunnel	Railway	481	526	Reduced from double track to single track in the 1970s	1851	
East Sussex	Mount Pleasant Tunnel	Railway	131	143		1851	
East Sussex	Patcham Tunnel	Railway	446	488		1841	
East Sussex	Wadhurst Tunnel	Railway	1,102	1,205	Reduced from double track to single track in 1985	1851	
Essex	Audley End Tunnel	Railway	417	456	Double track	1845	
Essex & Kent	Dartford West Tunnel	Road	1,436	1,570	Carries northbound traffic on the A282 as part of the Dartford Crossing, original tunnel	1963	
Essex & Kent	Dartford East Tunnel	Road	1,436	1,570	Carries northbound traffic on the A282 as part of the Dartford Crossing, carried southbound traffic until 1991	1980	
Essex & Kent	Thames Tunnel	Railway	3,115	3,406	Part of the High Speed 1 railway	2007	
Essex	Dartford Cable Tunnel	Electricity cables	2,400	2,624	Upriver from Dartford Road Tunnels, carrying 400kV cables	2004	
Essex	Bell Common Tunnel	Road	470	514	Cut-and-cover tunnel on the M25	1984	
Essex	Littlebury Tunnel	Railway	372	407	Two tracks, south portal is Grade II listed	1845	
Essex	Stansted Airport Tunnel	Railway	1,778	1,944	Single track	1991	
Essex & Kent	Thames Cable Tunnel	Electricity cables	1,675	1,832	Carries two 400kV electricity circuits	1970	
Gloucestershire	Chipping Sodbury Tunnel	Railway	4,064	4,444		1902	
Gloucestershire	Patchway Old Tunnel	Railway	1,140	1,246	In use for westbound trains		
Gloucestershire	Patchway New Tunnel	Railway	1,609	1,760	In use for eastbound trains	1886	
Gloucestershire	Sapperton Canal Tunnel	Canal	1,873	2,048		1789	
Gloucestershire	Larger Sapperton Tunnel	Railway	1,704	1,864	On the Golden Valley Line	1845	
Gloucestershire	Smaller Sapperton Tunnel	Railway	323	353	On the Golden Valley Line	1845	
Gloucestershire	Severn Tunnel (1810)	Tramroad	126	138	Abandoned, uncompleted in 1812 after flooding		51.78770°N 2.44598°W
Gloucestershire & Monmouthshire	Severn Tunnel	Railway	7,012	7,668	Longest mainline tunnel in the UK until 2007 when tunnels on High Speed 1 opened	1886	
Gloucestershire	Severn-Wye Cable Tunnel	Electricity cables	3,600		Carries two 400kV electricity circuits	1973	51.608459°N 2.615454°W
Gloucestershire	Micheldean Tunnel	Railway	715	782	Portals bricked up		
Greater Manchester	Clifton Hall Tunnel	Railway	1,187	1,298		1850	
Greater Manchester	Farnworth Tunnel	Railway	270	295	Built by the Manchester and Bolton Railway	1832	
Greater Manchester	Guardian Exchange	Telephone	1,300	1,422	Concrete and brick	1954	
Greater Manchester & Yorkshire – West	Standedge Tunnels	Canal	5,029	5,500	Disused 1945, reopened 2001, longest and highest canal tunnel in UK on Huddersfield Narrow Canal	1811	
Greater Manchester & Yorkshire – West	Standedge Tunnels (Central Tunnel)	Railway	4,880	5,337	First of the three rail tunnels to be opened, used for emergency access	1848	
Greater Manchester & Yorkshire – West	Standedge Tunnels (South Tunnel)	Railway	4,880	5,337	Second tunnel, single track	1871	
Greater Manchester & Yorkshire – West	Standedge Tunnels (live tunnel)	Railway	4,883	5,340	Third tunnel, double track, in use	1894	
Greater Manchester	Summit Tunnel	Railway	2,638	2,885		1841	
Hampshire	Fareham Tunnel No. 1	Railway	134	147	Also known as Funtley No.1, M27 passes overhead		
Hampshire	Fareham Tunnel No. 2	Railway	506	553	Also known as Funtley No.2		
Hampshire	Greywell Tunnel	Canal	1,125	1,230	Brick construction, disused - now a Site of Special Scientific Interest	1794	
Hampshire	Micheldever Tunnel	Railway	181	198	Also known as Litchfield Tunnel	1840	
Hampshire	Midhurst Tunnel	Railway	252	276			
Hampshire	Popham No. 1 Tunnel	Railway	242	265			
Hampshire	Popham No. 2 Tunnel	Railway	182	199			
Hampshire	Privett Tunnel	Railway	967	1,058	Closed 1955	1903	
Hampshire	Southampton Tunnel	Railway	483	528	Allows the South West Main Line to pass under the Civic Centre in Southampton	1847	
Hampshire	Wallers' Ash Tunnel	Railway	458	501			
Hampshire	Winchester Tunnel	Railway	422	461	Also known as St Giles or Chesil Tunnel		
Hampshire	Fawley Tunnel	Electricity cables	3,200	3,500	Two 400 kV electricity circuits	1965	50.826°N 1.314°W
Hertfordshire & London	Elstree to St. John's Wood Cable Tunnel	Electricity cables	19,800	21,653	3-metre diameter, forced air cooling, 7 ventilation shafts, carries one 400kV circuit, provision for second circuit, battery powered overhead monorail system for access	2005	
Hertfordshire	Hatfield Tunnel	Road	1,147	1,531	Cut-and-cover tunnel on the A1(M) between J3 and J4	1986	
Hertfordshire	Holmesdale Tunnel	Road	600	656	Cut-and-cover tunnel on the M25 between J25 and J26	1984	
Hertfordshire	Northchurch Tunnels	Railway	319	349	Bores consist of Down and Up fast (double track), Down slow (single track), Up slow (single track)	1838	
Hertfordshire	Ponsbourne Tunnel	Railway	2,454	2,684	Part of the Hertford Loop Line, it was the last tunnel constructed using traditional means	1918	
Hertfordshire	Potters Bar Tunnel	Railway	1,110	1,214	Bores consist of Down slow & fast, Up slow & fast	1849	51.6854°N 0.1849°W
Hertfordshire	Welwyn North Tunnel	Railway	956	1,046	Welwyn North Tunnel was the scene of a major accident in 1866	1850	
Hertfordshire	Welwyn South Tunnel	Railway	408	446		1850	
Hertfordshire	Weston Hills Tunnel	Road	230	250	Cut-and-cover tunnel on the A505	2006	
Hertfordshire	Watford Tunnels	Railway	1660	1,815	Part of the West Coast Main Line, first built for the London and Birmingham Railway	1837	51.681507°N 0.419055°W
Isle of Wight	Ryde Tunnel	Railway	358	391			
Isle of Wight	Ventnor Tunnel	Railway	1,201	1,313	Closed 1966	1866	
Kent & Pas-de-Calais (France)	Channel Tunnel	Railway	50,459	55,183	Consists of two single track railway tunnels and one service tunnel, 26,988 m of the tunnel is on the British side of the UK/France border	1994	
Kent	Ashford Cut and Cover Tunnel	Railway	1,562	1,708	Part of High Speed 1 railway	2003	
Kent	Medway Tunnel	Road	240	260	Carries A289	1996	
Kent	Ramsgate Tunnel	Road	800	875	Carries A299, also known as Pegwell Tunnel	2000	
Kent	Roundhill Tunnel	Road	380	416	Carries A20	1993	
Kent	Abbotscliffe Tunnel	Railway	1,800	1,969	Double track	1844	
Kent	Badgers Oak Tunnel	Railway	163	178	Closed 1961	1893	
Kent	Bourne Park Tunnel	Railway	370	400	Used to hide a giant railway borne artillery piece in World War Two, closed 16 June 1947	1887	
Kent	Charlton Tunnel	Railway	138	154			
Kent	Chatham Tunnel	Railway	272	297	Double track		
Kent	Chelsfield Tunnel	Railway	545	597	Double track	1868	51.3487°N 0.1178°E
Kent	Dover Harbour Tunnel	Railway	625	684		1861	
Kent	Edenbridge Tunnel	Railway	180	197		1888	
Kent	Eynsford Tunnel	Railway	757	828		1862	
Kent	Fort Pitt Tunnel	Railway	391	428	Double track		
Kent	Golgotha Tunnel	Railway	436	477	Single track but partly constructed for double track	1911	
Kent	Greenhithe Tunnel	Railway	228	253		1849	
Kent	Grove Tunnel	Railway	167	183	Closed on 6 July 1985 with the rest of the Tunbridge Wells West branch, single track	1876	
Kent	Grove Hill Tunnel	Railway	262	287	On the Hastings line	1851	
Kent	Guston Tunnel	Railway	1,287	1,408		1881	
Kent	Higham and Strood Tunnel	Railway	3,595	3,931	Built between 1819 and 1824 for the Thames and Medway Canal, single track railway laid on the tow-path in 1845, was soon doubled by infilling the canal, 100-yard air vent cut in the middle	1824	
Kent	Little Browns Tunnel	Railway	111	121		1888	
Kent	Lydden Tunnel	Railway	2,166	2,369		1861	
Kent	Mark Beech Tunnel	Railway	1,226	1,341		1888	
Kent	Martello Tunnel	Railway	500	547	Double track	1844	
Kent	North Downs Tunnel	Railway	3,200	3,500	Under Blue Bell Hill, tunnel is to UIC GB gauge on High Speed 1, double track but due to air pressure of opposing trains at high speeds trains are scheduled not to pass at the line speed of 300 km/h.	2001	
Kent	Polhill Tunnel	Railway	2,387	2,610	Double track	1868	51.3250°N 0.1626°E
Kent	Priory Tunnel	Railway	142	155		1861	
Kent	Ramsgate Harbour Tunnel	Railway	1,028	1,124	Closed 1926	1863	
Kent	River Medway Cable Tunnels	Electricity cables	1,700	1,860	Twin 2.54 m diameter tunnels, Isle of Grain to Chetney Marshes, each carries a 400kV circuit	1976	
Kent	Saltwood Tunnel	Railway	872	954		1843	
Kent	Sevenoaks Tunnel	Railway	3,156	3,520	Double track	1868	
Kent	Shakespeare Tunnel	Railway	1,260	1,387	Two individual single bore tunnels	1844	
Kent	Shepherd's Well Tunnel	Railway	2,138	2,376			
Kent	Somerhill Tunnel	Railway	370	410	Originally double track but reduced to single track in 1985	1845	
Kent	Strawberry Hill Tunnel	Railway	262	286	Originally double track but reduced to single track in 1985	1851	
Kent	Tyler Hill Tunnel	Railway	757	828	Underneath the main site of the University of Kent, the line was closed in 1953, part of the tunnel collapsed in July 1974	1830	
Kent	Wells Tunnel	Railway	753	823	Twin track	1846	
Kent	Wheeler Street Tunnel	Railway	327	358	Twin track	1884	
Lancashire	Blackburn Tunnel	Railway	398	435			
Lancashire	Foulridge Tunnel	Canal	1,487	1,626			
Lancashire	Gannow Tunnel	Canal	509	557			
Lancashire	Gisburn Tunnel	Railway	144	157		1880	
Lancashire	Haslingden (North Hag) Tunnel	Railway	134	146	Closed 1966	1848	
Lancashire	Holme Tunnel	Railway	242	265			
Lancashire	Melling Tunnel	Railway	1,120	1,230			
Lancashire	Sough Tunnel	Railway	1,843	2,015			
Lancashire	Upholland Tunnel	Railway	877	959			
Lancashire	Wilpshire Tunnel	Railway	297	325			
Lancashire	Thrutch Tunnel	Railway	541	592	1 track top section brick lined lower section stone, closed 1966	1880	53.691300°N 2.248735°W
Lancashire	Newchurch No.1 Tunnel	Railway	148	162	1 track top section brick lined lower section stone, closed 1966	1852	53.691400°N 2.248659°W
Lancashire	Newchurch No.2 Tunnel	Railway	270	290	1 track top section brick lined lower section stone, closed 1966	1852	53.690653°N 2.244961°W
Leicestershire	Ashby de la Zouch Tunnel	Railway	282	308	Also known as Old Parks or Ashby Tunnel		
Leicestershire	Clawson Tunnel	Railway	763	834	Also known as Hose Tunnel		
Leicestershire	Husbands Bosworth Tunnel	Canal	1,066	1,166		1813	
Leicestershire	Saddington Tunnel	Canal	805	880		1797	
Leicestershire	Glenfield Tunnel	Railway	1,633	1786	Closed 1966	1832	
Lincolnshire	Kirton-in-Lindsey Tunnel	Railway	1,200	1,312			
Lincolnshire	Stamford Tunnel	Railway	312	341			
Lincolnshire	Stoke Tunnel	Railway	800	880			
London	Northern line (Morden to East Finchley via Bank)	Railway	27,800	30,402	Deep level 'tube' lines constructed between 1886 and 1939	1890-1939	
London	Piccadilly line (Arnos Grove to Barons Court)	Railway	19,610	21,446	Deep level 'tube' lines constructed between 1902 and 1932	1906–32	
London	Piccadilly line (Hounslow Central to Heathrow Terminal 5)	Railway	8,760	9,580	Deep Level tunnel beyond Hatton Cross	1975-2008	
London	Victoria line (Brixton to Walthamstow Central)	Railway	22,040	24,103	Deep level 'tube' lines constructed between 1962 and 1972	1968–72	
London	Lee Tunnel	Sewer	6,900	7,545	Overflow sewer tunnel part of the Thames Tideway Scheme, 7.2m diameter	2016	
London	George Green Tunnel	Road	295	322	A12, construction disrupted by M11 link road protest	2000	
London	Green Man Tunnel	Road	170	185	A12, construction disrupted by M11 link road protest	2000	
London	Central line (Stratford to White City)	Railway	17,390	19,018	Deep level 'tube' lines constructed between 1896 and 1940	1900–46	
London	Northern line (Kennington to Golders Green via Charing Cross)	Railway	11,940	13,058	Deep level 'tube' lines constructed between 1902 and 1926	1907–26	
London	Bakerloo line (Elephant & Castle to Queen's Park)	Railway	10,900	11,920	Deep level 'tube' lines constructed between 1898 and 1915	1906–15	
London	Waterloo & City line (Waterloo to Bank)	Railway	2,226	2,434	Deep level 'tube' lines constructed between 1894 and 1898	1898	
London	Barnet Tunnel	Railway	553	607	3 bores: Down slow / Centre / Up Slow	1849	51.6295°N 0.1582°W
London	Belsize Fast Lines Tunnel	Railway	1,619	1,771	Midland Railway, now Midland Main Line	1868	
London	Belsize Slow Lines Tunnel	Railway	1,707	1,867	Midland Railway, now Midland Main Line/Thameslink	1884	
London	Bishopsgate Tunnel	Railway	573	627	Great Eastern Railway, Down/Up Suburban Lines from/to Liverpool Street station		
London	Blackwall Tunnel (Western bore)	Road	1,350	1,476	Built using tunnelling shields, one of the oldest road tunnels still in use, carries northbound traffic on the A102	1897	
London	Blackwall Tunnel (Eastern bore)	Road	1,174	1,284	Newer bore, carries southbound traffic on the A102	1967	
London	Camden Road Tunnels	Railway	288	315	Midland Railway. Down/Up Fast, Down/Up Slow, Down/Up Moorgate the latter is two tunnels of 205 and 66 yards	1867	
London	Canal Tunnels	Railway	688	628	2 bores: both bidirectional. Up Line 688y/628m, Down Line 723y/681m	2016	51.5400°N 0.1236°W
London	Canonbury Tunnel	Railway	498	545	Great Northern Railway, Now single track freight line	1874	
London	Clapton Tunnel	Railway	260	284	Great Eastern Railway	1872	
London	Copenhagen Tunnel	Railway	543	594	Great Northern Railway. West tunnel Up & Down Slow, Central tunnel Up & Down Fast, East Tunnel disused since 1977	1850, 1877, 1886	
London	Crossrail Royal Oak Portal to Victoria Dock portal	Railway	15,390	16,830	Twin tunnels 6.2m in diameter	2022	
London	Crossrail Pudding Mill Lane Portal to Stepney Green	Railway	2,720	2,974	Twin tunnels 6.2m in diameter	2022	
London	Crossrail Plumstead to North Woolwich Portal	Railway	2,640	2,887	Twin tunnels 6.2m in diameter	2022	
London	East India Dock Link	Road	350	383		1993	
London	Fore Street Tunnel	Road	310	339	A406, North Circular Road under Edmonton town centre, refurbished 2014	1998	
London	Gasworks Tunnel	Railway	483	528	Great Northern Railway. East bore was out of use 1977–2021.	1852, 1877, 1892	
London	Greenwich foot tunnel	Pedestrian	371	406	Runs beneath River Thames; being refurbished until 2014	1902	
London	Hadley Wood North Tunnels	Railway	212	232			
London	Hadley Wood South Tunnels	Railway	351	384			
London	Islington Tunnel	Canal	878	976	On Regent's Canal	1818	
London	Maida Hill Tunnel	Canal	251	272	On Regent's Canal	1816	
London	Eyre's tunnel	Canal	48	52	On Regent's Canal	1816	
London	Bankside power station cooling water discharge tunnel	River water	366	400	3 metres diameter, 10 metres below river Thames, terminating on the north bank of the river bed adjacent to St Paul's railway bridge, disused since 1981, now sealed	1952	
London	Battersea power station tunnels	Electricity cables, steam & hot water pipes			3 tunnels, 2 carrying cables under the Thames to either side of Chelsea bridge, third carrying steam and hot water pipes for a district heating system for the Churchill Gardens estate		
London	Hackney Downs or Queen's Road Tunnel	Railway	407	445	Great Eastern Railway	1872	
London	Hanger Lane	Road	240	262	A40, passing under the Hanger Lane gyratory	1960	
London	Eltham Tunnel	Road	156	170	A2 road, underneath Eltham railway station	1970	
London	Hampstead Heath Tunnel	Railway	1,066	1,166	Hampstead Junction Railway. Now North London Line	1860	
London	Kingsway Exchange	Telephone			Originally part of the Holborn deep shelter, it was used for telephone exchanges until closure in the 1990s due to asbestos	1954	
London	Kingsway tramway subway	Tramway			Constructed using cut-and-cover method. Abandoned in 1952 with the rest of the tram network, now partially used as the Strand Underpass	1906	
London	Limehouse Link tunnel	Road	1,800	1,969	Constructed with cut-and-cover methods, carries the A1203	1993	
London	London Deep Level Shelters	Air raid shelter	370	405	Eight built in total	1942	
London	Hampstead Tunnel	Railway	632	694	Great Central Railway, now Chiltern Main Line	1899	
London	Heathrow Tunnel	Road	630	688	Tunnel linking Airport loop road and M4/A4 to Heathrow Airport Central Terminal Area	1955	
London	Heathrow Airside Road Tunnel	Road	1,420	1,553	Links the Heathrow Airport Central Terminal Area with Terminal 5. Only open to vehicles with security clearance	2005	W. 51.46834°N 0.49059°W; E. 51.46954°N 0.45507°W
London	Heathrow Express Tunnel (Stockley Farm to Terminal 4)	Railway	6,800	7,463	Dual bore from Stockley Farm to Heathrow Terminals 2 & 3, single bore to Heathrow Terminal 4	1998	
London	Heathrow Express Tunnel (Terminal 1, 2 & 3 to Terminal 5)	Railway	2,600	2,843	Extension of Heathrow Express tunnels to Heathrow Terminal 5 station, dual bore tunnels	2005	
London	Heathrow Cargo Tunnel	Road	885	968	Links the Heathrow Airport Central Terminal Area with Heathrow Terminal 4. Only open to vehicles with security clearance	1968	51.46426°N 0.45555°W
London	Kensal Green Tunnels	Railway	293	320	London and Birmingham Railway: Down/Up Fast, Down/Up Slow. London North Western Railway: Down/Up DC Electric constructed 1915	1837	
London	London Post Office Railway	Railway	10,500	11,483	Narrow gauge railway built to transport mail between sorting offices. Now decommissioned but still kept in working order.	1927	
London	London Tunnel 1	Railway	7,538	8,243	Part of the High Speed 1 railway from Stratford to St Pancras	2007	
London	Primrose Hill Fast Tunnel	Railway	1,080	1,182	London North Western Railway	1879	
London	London Tunnel 2	Railway	10,120	11,067	Part of the High Speed 1 railway from Dagenham to Stratford	2007	
London	Temple Mills Tunnel	Railway	300	328	Links High Speed 1 railway to Temple Mills Depot	2007	
Kent	Pepper Hill Tunnel	Railway	515	563	Part of the High Speed 1 railway, south of Ebbsfleet International	2007	
London	Primrose Hill Slow Tunnel	Railway	1,070	1,170	London and Birmingham Railway	1837	
London	Silvertown Tunnel	Road	1565	1711	Twin tunnels, carries the A1026	2025	
London	Rotherhithe Tunnel	Road	1,481	1,619		1908	
London	Snow Hill tunnel	Railway				1866	
London	St John's Wood Tunnel	Railway	1,469	1,606	Great Central Railway, now Chiltern Main Line	1899	
London	South Hampstead Tunnel	Railway	1,328	1,452	London North Western Railway. Up tunnel is 1,264 yd (1,156 m)	1922	
London	Eastway	Road	290	317	Built as the East Cross Route, now the A12	1974	
London	South Harrow Tunnel	Railway	187	204	Great Central Railway, now Chiltern Main Line	1905	
London	Strand Underpass	Road	365	399	Formed from the disused Kingsway Tramway Subway	1964	
London	Sydenham Hill (also Penge)	Railway	1,958	2,141	The tunnel was disliked by Queen Victoria, brick lining was made from clay extracted from the tunnel itself	1863	
London	Thames Tunnel	Railway	396	433	Built by Marc Brunel and originally opened as a pedestrian link between Rotherhithe and Wapping, taken over by the East London Railway and now part of the London Overground	1843	
London	Thames–Lea water main tunnel	Water	30,577	33,440	Water from the Thames at Sunbury to Chingford reservoirs	1959	
London	Tottenham North Curve Tunnel No.1	Railway	146	160	Midland Railway	1883	
London	New Cross to Finsbury Market Cable Tunnel	Electricity cables	5,700	6233	2.85-metre diameter tunnel, carries 132 kV electric cables for UK Power Networks	2017	
London	Lower Lea Valley Cable Tunnels	Electricity cables	6,000	6561	Built as part of the Queen Elizabeth Olympic Park infrastructure, carries electricity cables (400kV for National Grid, 132kV for UK Power Networks)	2007	
London	London Power Tunnels Phase 1	Electricity cables	32,000	34995	Wimbledon to Willesden and Hackney, carries electricity cables (400kV for National Grid, 132kV for UK Power Networks)	2018	
London	Tower Subway	Pedestrian	411	450	Built using Tunnelling shields. Closed in 1898 due to the opening of the Tower Bridge. Now used for water mains only	1870	
London	Wood Green Tunnel	Railway	645	705	3 bores: Down slow / Centre / Up Slow	1848	51.6050°N 0.1340°W
London	Woolwich foot tunnel	Pedestrian	498	545	Under River Thames	1912	
Merseyside	Kingsway Tunnel	Road	2,483	2,715	Also called Wallasey Tunnel	1971	
Merseyside	Mersey Railway	Railway	3,820	4,180	Length of tunnel under the river	1886–1892	
Merseyside	Tranmere tunnels	Shelter			Length of tunnel		
Merseyside	Queensway Tunnel	Road	3,237	3,540	Longest road tunnel in UK	1934	
Merseyside	Victoria Tunnel & Waterloo Tunnel	Railway	3,254	3,559	The Victoria and Waterloo tunnels - 2,475 and 862 metres (2,707 and 943 yd) - form a single tunnel divided by an air shaft, and having different names on each side of the shaft	1849	
Merseyside	Wapping Tunnel	Railway	2,030	2,220	Originally static steam engine haulage because of the steep gradient, then locomotive hauled. Closed on 15 May 1972	1829	
Merseyside	Williamson Tunnels	Folly	3,000	3,281		1800–40	
Norfolk	Aylsham Bypass Tunnel	Railway	166	182	On narrow gauge Bure Valley Railway	1990	
Norfolk	Cromer Tunnel	Railway	56	61		1888	
Northamptonshire	Blisworth Tunnel	Canal	2,794	3,056	Grand Union Canal	1805	
Northamptonshire	Braunston Tunnel	Canal	1,887	2,064	Grand Union Canal	1796	
Northamptonshire	Catesby Tunnel	Railway	2,740	2,997	Great Central Railway	1899	
Northamptonshire	Corby Tunnel	Railway	1,760	1,920		1878	
Northamptonshire	Crick Tunnel	Canal	1,397	1,528		1814	
Northamptonshire	Hunsbury Hill Tunnel	Railway	1,053	1,152		1881	
Northamptonshire	Kelmarsh Tunnel	Railway	480	525	Was single bore, but doubled. Now pedestrian	1859	
Northamptonshire	Kilsby Tunnel	Railway	2,218	2,426		1838	
Northamptonshire	Oxendon Tunnel	Railway	418	457	Was single bore, but doubled. Now pedestrian	1859	
Northamptonshire	Stowe Hill tunnel	Railway	449	491	Single bore, twin tracks. West Coast Main Line	1838	
Northumberland	Hillhead Tunnel	Railway	321	351	Single Bore, brick lined	1887	55.39217°N 1.83236°W
Nottinghamshire	Annesley Tunnel	Railway	915	1,001		1892	
Nottinghamshire	Ashwell Tunnel	Railway	64	70		1889	
Nottinghamshire	Drakeholes Tunnel	Canal	141	154		1777	
Nottinghamshire	Mapperley Tunnel	Railway	1,035	1,132		1875	
Nottinghamshire	Park Tunnel	Horsedrawn carriages	125	136		1855	
Nottinghamshire	Sherwood Tunnel	Railway	404	442		1889	
Nottinghamshire	Sherwood Rise Tunnel	Railway	605	662		1899	
Nottinghamshire	Sneinton Tunnel	Railway	117	128		1889	
Nottinghamshire	Stanton Tunnel	Railway	1,220	1,330	Railway Test Track, Stanton on the Wolds	1879	
Nottinghamshire	Thorneywood Tunnel	Railway	373	408		1889	
Nottinghamshire	Victoria Street Tunnel	Railway	266	291	Also known as Weekday Cross Tunnel	1897	
Nottinghamshire	Watnall Tunnel	Railway	245	268			
Nottinghamshire	Mansfield Road Tunnel	Railway	1,087	1,189		1898	
Oxfordshire	Ardley Tunnel	Railway	1,056	1,155	Great Western Railway, now Chiltern Main Line	1910	
Oxfordshire	Bodleian Library Tunnel	Library					
Oxfordshire	Horspath or Wheatley Tunnel	Railway	479	524	Great Western Railway, closed 1963	1864	
Oxfordshire	Wolvercot Tunnel	Railway	133	145	Buckinghamshire Railway	1850	
Rutland	Glaston Tunnel	Railway	1,684	1,842		1878	
Rutland	Manton Tunnel	Railway	685	749		1846	
Rutland	Seaton Tunnel	Railway	188	206		1878	
Rutland	Wing Tunnel	Railway	323	353		1878	
Shropshire	Oakengates Tunnel	Railway	430	471		1849	
Somerset	Combe Down Tunnel	Railway	1,672	1,829	Somerset and Dorset Joint Railway, between Devonshire Tunnel and Midford - closed in 1966	1874	
Somerset	Devonshire Tunnel	Railway	409	447	Somerset and Dorset Joint Railway between Bath Green Park and Combe Down Tunnel; Closed in 1966 now a cycle path	1874	
Somerset	Somerton Tunnel	Railway	963	1,053	Built as part of the Langport and Castle Cary Railway. Part of the Berks and Hants Line between Taunton and Castle Cary	1906	51.04344°N 2.75761°W
Somerset	White Ball Tunnel	Railway	990	1,092	Bristol to Exeter line between Taunton and Tiverton Junction on Somerset–Devon border	1844	
Somerset	Winsor Hill Down Tunnel	Railway	219	239	Brick-lined, Somerset and Dorset Joint Railway between Masbury and Shepton Mallet Rail service closed in 1966 and the tunnel was closed to walkers until the late 1990s	1874	
Somerset	Winsor Hill Up Tunnel	Railway	115	126	Brick-lined, Somerset and Dorset Joint Railway between Masbury and Shepton Mallet Rail service closed in 1966 and the tunnel opened to walkers.	1892	
Staffordshire	Cheddleton Tunnel	Railway	486	531	Churnet Valley Railway	1849	
Staffordshire	Harecastle Tunnel (Brindley)	Canal	2,630	2,880	Closed in 1914 due to subsidence	1777	
Staffordshire	Harecastle Tunnel (Telford)	Canal	2,676	2,926		1827	
Staffordshire	Harecastle railway tunnel	Railway	200	243	On new diversion replacing three Victorian tunnels	1965	
Staffordshire	Leek Tunnel	Railway	432	472	disused since 1964	1849	
Staffordshire	Meir Tunnel	Railway	744	814		1894	
Staffordshire	Meir Tunnel	Road	260	284	Carries A50	1997	
Staffordshire	Oakamoor Tunnel	Railway	454	497	disused since 1965, though plans are afoot to relay the line and reopen the tunnel	1849	
Staffordshire	Shugborough Tunnel	Railway	710	777		1847	
Staffordshire	Swainsley Tunnel	Road	150	164	former railway tunnel on the Leek and Manifold Light Railway	1904	
Suffolk	Stoke Tunnel	Railway	330	361		1846	
Surrey	Betchworth Tunnel	Railway	352	385	South of Dorking station	1867	
Surrey	Bletchingley Tunnel	Railway	1,213	1,327		1842	
Surrey	Hindhead Tunnel	Road	1,830	2,001	Part of the A3 bypassing Hindhead and the Devil's Punchbowl	2011	
Surrey	Limpsfield Tunnel	Railway	504	551		1884	
Surrey	Merstham Tunnel	Railway	1,674	1,831		1841	
Surrey	Mickleham Tunnel	Railway	479	524	Runs under the eastern side of Norbury Park between Leatherhead and Dorking	1867	
Surrey	Oxted Tunnel	Railway	2,067	2,261		1884	
Surrey	Quarry Tunnel	Railway	1,932	2,113		1899	
Surrey	Redhill Tunnel	Railway	593	649		1899	
Surrey	Reigate Tunnel	Horsedrawn carriages	51	56	Brick, length is approximate, said to be the first road tunnel	1823	
Surrey	St Catherine's Tunnel	Railway	121	132	Built by the London and South Western Railway, runs under St Catherine's Hill south of Guildford, also known as the Guildford Sand Tunnel	1849	
Surrey	Staines– Kempton aqueduct tunnel	Water	7640	8355	River water from the Thames at Hythe End to Kempton Park water works	1963	
Tyne and Wear	Tyne Cyclist and Pedestrian Tunnel	Pedestrian	270	300	Cyclist and Pedestrian tunnel from Howdon (North) and Jarrow (South)	1951	
Tyne and Wear	Tyne Tunnel (Western bore)	Road	1,676	1,833	Carries northbound traffic on the A19, original tunnel	1967	
Tyne and Wear	Tyne Tunnel (Eastern bore)	Road	1,600	1,750	Carries southbound traffic on the A19	2011	
Tyne and Wear	Victoria Tunnel	Wagonway				1842	
Tyne and Wear	Tyne and Wear Metro Tunnels	Railway			Carries the Tyne and Wear Metro through the Central Core of the system.	1980, 1981 and 1982	
Warwickshire	Fenny Compton Tunnel	Canal	1,000		2.75 metres wide with 4.87 metre passing places, opened out to a deep cutting 1838-1870	1776	
Warwickshire	Shrewley Tunnel	Canal	396	433		1799	
Warwickshire	Newbold Tunnel	Canal		250		1778	
West Midlands	Anchor Exchange	Telephone					52.4829°N 1.9042°W
West Midlands	Snow Hill Tunnel	Railway	581	635		1852	52.48095°N 1.89615°W
West Midlands	Black Lake Tunnel	Railway	377	412	Closed 1972, but later reopened for use by the West Midlands Metro in 1999	1854	
West Midlands	Dudley Tunnel	Canal	2,884	3,154		1792	52.517544°N 2.086741°W
West Midlands	Dudley Railway Tunnel	Railway	867	948		1850	52.508392°N 2.078701°W
West Midlands	Hockley Tunnel 1	Railway	124	136	Closed 1972, but later reopened for use by the West Midlands Metro in 1999	1854	
West Midlands	Hockley Tunnel 2	Railway	150	160	Closed 1972, but later reopened for use by the West Midlands Metro in 1999	1854	
West Midlands	Lapal Tunnel	Canal	3,470	3,795	Disused since 1917	1798	52.4450°N 2.0017°W
West Midlands	Netherton Canal Tunnel	Canal	2,768	3,027		1858	52.50435°N 2.05932°W
West Midlands	Queensway (Birmingham)	Road	548	600		1971	52.4830°N 1.9026°W
West Midlands & Worcestershire	Wast Hill Tunnel	Canal	2,493	2,726	Wide enough to accommodate two narrow boats but there is no towpath	1796	
West Sussex	Balcombe tunnel	Railway	1,036	1,133		1841	
West Sussex	Clayton Tunnel	Railway	2,066	2,259		1841	
West Sussex	Haywards Heath Tunnel	Railway	228	249		1841	
West Sussex	Lywood Tunnel	Railway	197	215	Closed 1963	1883	
West Sussex	Midhurst Tunnel	Railway	252	276	Closed 1964	1866	
West Sussex	Sharpthorne Tunnel	Railway	668	731	Closed 1965, reopened 1994	1882	
West Sussex	Southwick Hill Tunnel	Road	490	536	Twin-bore tunnel, part of A27 Brighton Bypass	1996	
Wiltshire	Box Tunnel	Railway	2,937	3,212		1841	
Wiltshire	Bruce Tunnel	Canal	459	502	Kennet and Avon Canal	1809	
Wiltshire	Alderton Tunnel	Railway	463	506	South Wales main line	1903	
Herefordshire & Worcestershire	Colwall Old Tunnel	Railway	1,433	1,567	Closed 1926	1861	
Herefordshire & Worcestershire	Colwall New Tunnel	Railway	1,433	1,567	In service on the Cotswold Line	1926	
Herefordshire	Ledbury Tunnel	Railway	1,205	1,318	In service	1861	
Herefordshire	Dinmore Tunnel	Railway	970	1,060	In service on Welsh Marches Line, opened 1853 Up Line and 1891 Down Line	1853, 1891	
Worcestershire	Redditch Tunnel	Railway	300	330	Closed 1980s	1868	
Yorkshire – East	Drewton Tunnel	Railway	1,933	2,114	Hull & Barnsley, closed 1959	1885	
Yorkshire - East & Lincolnshire	Humber Gas Tunnel	Natural gas	4,900	5,400	Tunnel boring machine (TBM)/Concrete lining	December 2020	53.701°N 0.242°W
Yorkshire – East	Sugar Loaf Tunnel	Railway	121	132	Hull & Barnsley, closed 1959	1885	
Yorkshire – East	Weedley Tunnel	Railway	121	132	Hull & Barnsley, closed 1959	1885	
Yorkshire – North	Burdale Tunnel	Railway	1,597	1,746		1853	
Yorkshire – North	Blea Moor Tunnel	Railway	2,404	2,629	Settle–Carlisle line	1876	
Yorkshire – North	Grosmont Horse Tunnel	Railway	119	130	Whitby & Pickering Railway	1835	
Yorkshire – North	Prospect Tunnel	Railway	754	825	In Crimple, Harrogate	1848	
Yorkshire – North	Falsgrave Tunnel	Railway	240	260		1885	54°16′35.9″N 0°24′33.8″W
Yorkshire – North	Haw Bank Tunnel	Railway	200	220		1888	
Yorkshire – North	Kettleness Tunnel	Railway	282	308		1883	
Yorkshire – North	Ravenscar Tunnel	Railway	255	279	Also Peak Tunnel	1885	
Yorkshire – North	Sandsend Tunnel	Railway	1,511	1,652		1883	
Yorkshire – North	Woodsmith Mine Tunnel	Mineral transport	37,000	40,464	Tunnel boring machines	Due 2021	54.5182°N 0.9599°W
Yorkshire – South	Bradway Tunnel	Railway	1,853	2,027		1870	
Yorkshire – South	Cat Hill Tunnel	Railway	141	154		1840	
Yorkshire – South	Norwood Tunnel	Canal	2,637	2,884	Disused since 1907	1775	
Yorkshire – South	Thurgoland Tunnel (old)	Railway	288	315	Down line from 1952 – Closed 1983	1845	
Yorkshire – South	Thurgoland Tunnel (new)	Railway	310	339	Second single-track bore (up line) opened 1952 due to clearance problems on curves, closed 1983	1953	
Derbyshire & Yorkshire – South	Woodhead Tunnel 1	Railway	4,840	5,293	First of 3 railway tunnels, closed for railway traffic in 1953, disused	1845	
Derbyshire & Yorkshire – South	Woodhead Tunnel 2	Railway	4,840	5,293	Second of 3 railway tunnels, closed for railway traffic in 1953, now used by National Grid for 400kV electricity cables	1853	
Derbyshire & Yorkshire – South	Woodhead Tunnel 3	Railway	4,871	5,340	Third of 3 railway tunnels, closed for railway traffic in 1981, now used by National Grid for 400kV electricity cables	1953	
Yorkshire – West	Bingley Tunnel	Railway	138	151	Airedale Line	1847	
Yorkshire – West	Bowling Tunnel	Railway	1,507	1,648	Calder Valley Line	1850	
Yorkshire – West	Bramhope Tunnel	Railway	3,439	3,761	Harrogate Line	1849	
Yorkshire – West	Gildersome Tunnel	Railway	2,131	2,331	Disused tunnel on the former Leeds New Line. Filled with colliery waste to support the M62 being built on top of it in 1971	1900	53°45′06.2″N 1°37′27.3″W
Yorkshire – West	Greenside Tunnel	Railway	563	616	Located on the former Pudsey Loop line	1893	53°47′23″N 1°40′12″W
Yorkshire – West	Leeds Inner Ring Road Tunnel	Road	367	401	Leeds Inner Ring Road A58(M) under the Leeds General Infirmary	1969	
Yorkshire – West	Lees Moor Tunnel	Railway	1,402	1,533		1884	53°50′11.9″N 1°55′32″W
Yorkshire – West	Morley Tunnel	Railway	3,081	3,369		1848	
Yorkshire – West	Queensbury Tunnel	Railway	2,501	2,287	Closed in 1963 - proposal to re-open the tunnel as part of the Great Northern railway Trail	1879	53°45′59.4″N 1°51′24.3″W
Yorkshire – West	Richmond Hill Tunnel	Railway	640	700	Leeds and Selby Railway	1834	53.795°N 1.522°W
Yorkshire – West	Summit Tunnel	Railway	2,638	2,885	Manchester and Leeds Railway	1841	
Yorkshire – West	Thackley Tunnel	Railway	1,200	1,300	Airedale Line	1845	
Yorkshire – West	Victoria Avenue Tunnel	Road	237	258	Carries A658 under the runway of Leeds Bradford International Airport	1982/3	
Yorkshire – West	Well Heads Tunnel	Railway	605	662	Former Great Northern Queensbury Lines	1882	53°47′35.6″N 1°52′39.1″W
Yorkshire – West	Gledholt North Tunnel	Railway	222	243	Huddersfield line	1849	53°38′36.6″N 1°47′54.1″W
Yorkshire – West	Gledholt South Tunnel	Railway	213	233	Huddersfield line	1886	53°38′36.6″N 1°47′54.1″W

== Wales ==
Location	Tunnel	Type	Length (m)	Length (yd)	Construction method / Notes	Date of opening
Anglesey	Bodorgan Tunnel	Railway	530	580	Two sections of tunnel (approx. 80m and 375m long) separated by open cut	1849
Caerphilly	Penar Tunnel	Railway	219	239	On Halls Road Branch between Risca and Markham	
Caerphilly	Glyn Tunnel, Hafodyrynys	Railway	260	280	Taff Vale Extension. Single track. Closed 1964. Portals now backfilled	1857
Caerphilly	Caerphilly Tunnel	Railway	1,768	1933	In use between Thornhill, Cardiff and Caerphilly. On the Rhymney Railway	1871
Cardiff	Queensgate Tunnel	Road	715	782	Part of the A4232 Butetown link road	1995
Carmarthenshire	Pencader Tunnel	Railway	901	985	Built for broad gauge	1861
Conwy	Conwy Road Tunnel	Road	1,080	1181	Carries the A55 road around Conwy	1991
Conwy	Penmaenbach Westbound Tunnel	Road	658	720	Carries the Westbound A55 road through the Penmaenbach headland	1989
Conwy	Penmaenbach Eastbound Headland Tunnel	Road	172	188	Carries the Eastbound A55 road through the Penmaenbach headland	1932
Conwy	Pen-y-Clip Westbound Tunnel	Road	930	1017	Carries the Westbound A55 road through the Pen-y-Clip headland	1994
Gwynedd	Penhelig Tunnels (Aberdovey No. 1, Fron-goch)	Railway	180	200	One of four tunnels on the Cambrian Coast Railway.	1867
Gwynedd	Penhelig Tunnels (Aberdovey No. 2, Morfa Bach)	Railway	200	219	One of four tunnels on the Cambrian Coast Railway.	1867
Gwynedd	Penhelig Tunnels (Aberdovey No. 3)	Railway	175	191	One of four tunnels on the Cambrian Coast Railway.	1867
Gwynedd	Penhelig Tunnels (Aberdovey No. 4, Craig-y-Don)	Railway	487	533	One of four tunnels on the Cambrian Coast Railway.	1867
Gwynedd	Ffestiniog Tunnel	Railway	3,407	3726	UK's longest single-track tunnel, in use on the Conwy Valley Line	1879
Monmouthshire & Gloucestershire	Severn Tunnel	Railway	7,012	7668	Longest mainline tunnel in the UK until 2007 when tunnels on High Speed 1 opened	1886
Monmouthshire	Gibraltar Tunnel	Road	185	202	Twin bore on A40 dual carriageway	1968
Monmouthshire	Bryn Tunnel, Hengoed	Railway	364	398	On Newport, Abergavenny and Hereford Railway from Pontllanfraith to Hengoed. Portals now buried	
Monmouthshire	Clydach Tunnels	Railway	250	273	Between Nantyglo and Govilon. Closed 1958	1862, doubled 1877
Monmouthshire	Gelli-felen Tunnels	Railway	230	352	Co-located with Clydach. On a continuous curve of approximately 120 degrees	1862
Monmouthshire	Monmouth Troy	Railway	130	142	Disused and blocked	1857
Monmouthshire	Usk	Railway	234	256	Disused but walkable	1857
Neath Port Talbot	Cymmer, Afan Valley	Railway	1,458	1595	Built by the Great Western Railway. Single track. Straight. North end relandscaped	
Neath Port Talbot	Gelli, Afan Valley	Railway	153	167	Rhondda and Swansea Bay Railway. Single track. Stone and brick. Closed 1964.	1882
Neath Port Talbot	Gyfylchi Tunnel, Tonmawr / Afan Valley	Railway (disused)	932	1019	Single track. North end collapsed 1947. South Wales Mineral Railway.	1863
Neath Port Talbot	Cwmcerwyn, Maesteg	Railway	920	1010	Built by the Port Talbot Railway and Docks Company. Single track, curved.	1964
Newport	Hillfield Tunnels, Newport	Railway	700	770	Mainline tunnel west of Newport railway station.	
Newport	Gaer Tunnel, Newport	Railway	369	403	Line to Bassaleg west of Hillfield Tunnels.	
Newport	Brynglas Tunnels	Road	370	400	Twin-bore, two-lane tunnels on M4.	1967
Pembrokeshire	Saundersfoot Railway	Railway	450	490	3 short Coppet Hall Tunnels on the shoreline plus the longer Hill Tunnel inland	
Powys	Torpantau Tunnel	Railway	610	666	Brecon and Merthyr Railway. Also called Summit or Beacons Tunnel. Highest rail tunnel in UK at 1,313 feet (400 m)	1863
Powys	Tal-y-llyn Tunnel	Railway	616	674	Brecon and Merthyr Railway	1864
Powys	Ashford Tunnel	Canal	343	375	Monmouthshire and Brecon Canal	1800
Powys	Rhayader Tunnel	Railway	270	290	Mid Wales Railway. Closed 1963. Now a nature reserve	1864
Powys	Marteg Tunnel	Railway	340	372	Mid Wales Railway. Closed 1963. North-west of Rhayader	1864
Merthyr Tydfil CBC	Abernant / Merthyr	Railway	2,283	2497	Single track bore, curved at west end and with double-track portal.	1853
Rhondda Cynon Tâf	Garth or Walnut Tree Tunnel	Railway	410	490	Barry Railway Company Penrhos branch to Llanbradach. Double track. Closed 1963. Partly breached by Garth Quarry.	1905
Merthyr Tydfil CBC	Morlais Tunnel, Merthyr Tydfil	Railway	948	1040	Double track, curved at west end. 3 airshafts. Closed 6 January 1958. Linked LNWR with Brecon and Merthyr Tydfil Junction Railway at Morlais Junction.	1 June 1879
Merthyr Tydfil CBC	Quaker's Yard or Cefn-Glas Tunnel, Abercynon	Railway	643	703	Vale of Neath / West Midland Railway GWR. Closed to traffic in 1964.	1851
Rhondda Cynon Tâf	Rhondda Tunnel	Railway	3,148	3443	Single track. Closed due to subsidence in the 1960s.	1890
Rhondda Cynon Tâf	Tinworks, Treforest	Water	140	150	Mill race "feeder" for Crawshays Tinworks. Tunnel made when embankment was constructed	1907
Rhondda Cynon Tâf	Pontypridd	Railway	1,210	1323	Barry Railway Company Closed and bricked up	1889
Rhondda Cynon Tâf	Tongwynlais	Railway	160	180	Cardiff Railway through the Taffs Well gorge. Closed 1938. Removed in constructing A470 dual carriageway at Tongwynlais.	1907
Swansea	Penllergaer Tunnel	Railway	267	292	Active freight and sometimes passenger line on Swansea District Line	1912
Swansea	Llangyfelach Tunnel	Railway	1,785	1952	Active freight and sometimes passenger line on Swansea District Line	1912
Swansea	Peniel Green Tunnel (Lônlas)	Railway	845	924	Active freight and sometimes passenger line on Swansea District Line	1912
Swansea	Cockett Tunnel	Railway	721	788	South Wales Main Line, reduced from 829 yards in 1908	1852
Torfaen	Pwll Du Tunnel	Tramroad	1875	2,051	Opened 1816 linking Blaenavon with Pwll Du	1926
Vale of Glamorgan	Wenvoe Tunnel	Railway	1,707	1867	Barry Railway. Closed 1964.	1898
Vale of Glamorgan	Cogan Tunnel	Railway	203	222	Barry Railway.	1886
Vale of Glamorgan	Barry Island Tunnel. Also called "Pier Tunnel"	Railway	260	280	Barry Railway. Closed in the 1970s bricked up but part of bore used as a rifle range from west portal access.	1897
Vale of Glamorgan	Porthkerry No.1 Tunnel	Railway	498	545	Vale of Glamorgan Railway	1898
Wrexham	Chirk Tunnel	Canal	420	459	First in UK to have a towpath	1802

== Northern Ireland ==
Location	Tunnel	Type	Length (m)	Length (yd)	Construction method / Notes	Date of opening
Londonderry	Castlerock	Rail	611	668	Brick	1845–1853
Londonderry	Downhill	Rail	281	307		1845–1846
Armagh	Lissummon	Rail	1,608	1759	Stone with some brick	early 1860s
Down	Binnian Tunnel	Aqueduct	4,000	4400	Stone	1948–1952
Antrim	Whitehead	Rail	159	145	Closed in 1994 until further notice.	1862–1994
Tyrone	Dungannon	Rail	870	800		1862

== Scotland ==
Location	Tunnel	Type	Length (m)	Length (yd)	Construction method / Notes	Date of opening
Dundee	Marketgait Tunnel	Road	230	250	Cut and cover. Length	
Midlothian	Broomieknowe Tunnel	Railway	393	430	Closed 1951	1877
Glasgow	Clyde Tunnel	Road	762	833		1964
Dumfries and Galloway	Drumlanrig Tunnel	Railway	1,270	1,389		
Glasgow	Glasgow Subway	Railway	10,500	11,440		1896
Scottish Borders	Whitrope Tunnel	Railway	1,105	1,208	Closed 1969	1862
Scottish Borders	Penmanshiel Tunnel	Railway	244	267	Original tunnel closed in 1979 after collapse and new cutting constructed adjacent to old tunnel.	1979
Scottish Highlands	Nevis Tunnel	Water	24,000	26,400	hydroelectric scheme	1929
Dundee	Dock Street Tunnel	Railway	558	610		
Aberdeen	Schoolhill Tunnel	Railway	229	250		
Aberdeen	Hutcheon Street Tunnel	Railway	256	280		
Edinburgh	Scotland Street Tunnel	Railway	914	1,000		1847
Edinburgh	Bowshank Tunnel	Railway	226	247		
Edinburgh	Innocent Tunnel, also St Leonard's Tunnel	Railway	518	566	Edinburgh and Dalkeith Railway. Closed 1968. Now a footpath and cyclepath.	1831
Falkirk	Falkirk Tunnel	Canal	630	690	Union Canal connection to Falkirk Wheel and Forth and Clyde Canal	1822
Glasgow	Kelvingrove Tunnel	Railway	870	950	Glasgow Central Railway. Closed 1964	1896
Glasgow	Cowlairs Tunnel	Railway	905	990		1842
Glasgow	Anderston Tunnel	Railway	2,533	2,770		
Glasgow	Canning Street Tunnel	Railway	423	463		
Glasgow	Stobcross Street Tunnel	Railway	585	640		
Glasgow	Dalmarnock Road Tunnel	Railway	722	790		
Glasgow	Charing Cross Tunnel	Railway	1,006	1,100		
Glasgow	Glasgow Harbour Tunnel	Vehicle and pedestrian	213	233	3 bores. Vehicles hoisted to tunnel level. Closed 1987	1895
South Lanarkshire	Barncluith Tunnel	Railway	347	380		
South Lanarkshire	Kirkhill Tunnel	Railway	265	290		
Perth and Kinross	Moncrieffe Tunnel	Railway	1,106	1,210		
Inverclyde	Newton Street Tunnel	Railway	1,930	2,110	Longest bored railway tunnel in Scotland, linking Greenock to Gourock	1889

== See also ==
- List of bridges in the United Kingdom
- Subterranean London
