= London Power Tunnels =

Network of tunnels in London carrying high-voltage electricity transmission cables

Location
- Country: UK
- Province: Greater London

Ownership information
- Owner: National Grid plc
- Operator: National Grid plc, UK Power Networks

Construction information
- Construction started: 2011
- Expected: 2026
- Construction cost: £1bn (phase 1) £1bn (phase 2)

Technical information
- Type: Underground tunnel
- Current type: AC
- Total length: 60 km (37 mi)
- AC voltage: 400 kV and 132 kV

London Power Tunnels is a project by National Grid to reinforce the electricity transmission network in London, UK, by constructing more than 60 km of new deep-level tunnels carrying high-voltage cables.

The new network of tunnels replaces a series of ageing power cables, most of which were buried directly beneath roads. These were becoming unreliable, difficult to maintain without disrupting traffic and were unable to meet future demand for electricity. The new tunnels allow the power cables to be upgraded and maintained without disruption to traffic and residents on the surface.

The project is divided into two phases: the first phase involved constructing tunnels connecting substations at Wimbledon, Hackney and Willesden and was completed in 2018. The second phase involves linking Wimbledon substation with Crayford and is expected to be completed in 2026.

External videos
- Inside the hidden 'power tunnels' of London, BBC video

== Phase 1 ==
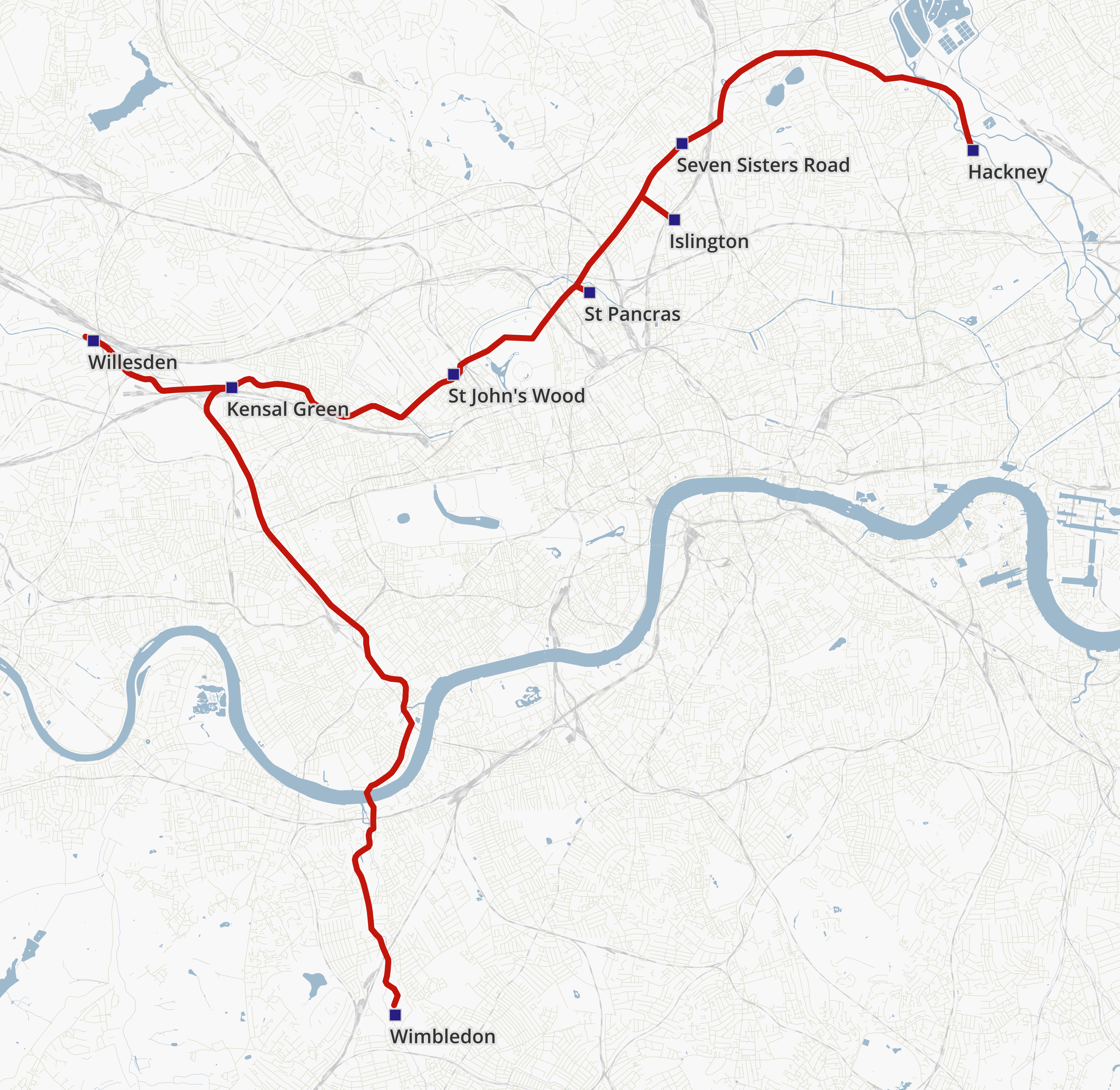
Map of London Power Tunnels phase 1

The first phase involved constructing 32 km of tunnels linking substations from Wimbledon in the south west to Hackney in north east of London, at a cost of £1 bn. The 3–4 m diameter tunnels were dug by tunnel boring machines and run 20–60 m below street level. The tunnels were constructed by a joint venture between Costain Group and Skanska.

This phase linked Wimbledon and Hackney to substations at Willesden, St John's Wood, St Pancras, and Islington. It also involved the construction of two new substations at Seven Sisters Road in Highbury, and at Kensal Green, to feed traction power to Crossrail.

As well as the main 400 kV power transmission circuits for the National Grid, the tunnels also carry 132 kV circuits from Islington substation to St Pancras and Seven Sisters Road, forming part of the London power distribution network operated by UK Power Networks.

Construction began in February 2011 and the first section was energised five years later in February 2016. The project was officially opened by Charles III (then Prince of Wales) in February 2018.

== Phase 2 ==
Construction of the second phase (known as LPT2) started in spring 2020 and spans 32.5 km from Wimbledon to Crayford in south-east London, connecting to existing substations at New Cross, Kidbrooke, and Hurst Grid Substation in Bexley. Access shafts were constructed at King's Avenue in Brixton and at Eltham, and a new substation was constructed at Bengeworth Road in Lambeth.

The tunnels are between 3–3.5 m in diameter, 10–63 m below street level, with most being around 30 m deep. The project was initially planned to cost £750m, and is now expected to cost £1 billion.

The contract for the second phase was awarded to a joint venture between Murphy Group and Hochtief in December 2019. Construction on this phase started in May 2021, tunnelling was completed in October 2023, with the first parts of the project coming into operation from August 2024.

== See also ==
- Elstree to St. John's Wood Cable Tunnel
- New Cross to Finsbury Market Cable Tunnel
- Lower Lea Valley Cable Tunnels
