= Stratford International station =

Docklands Light Railway and National Rail station

Stratford International
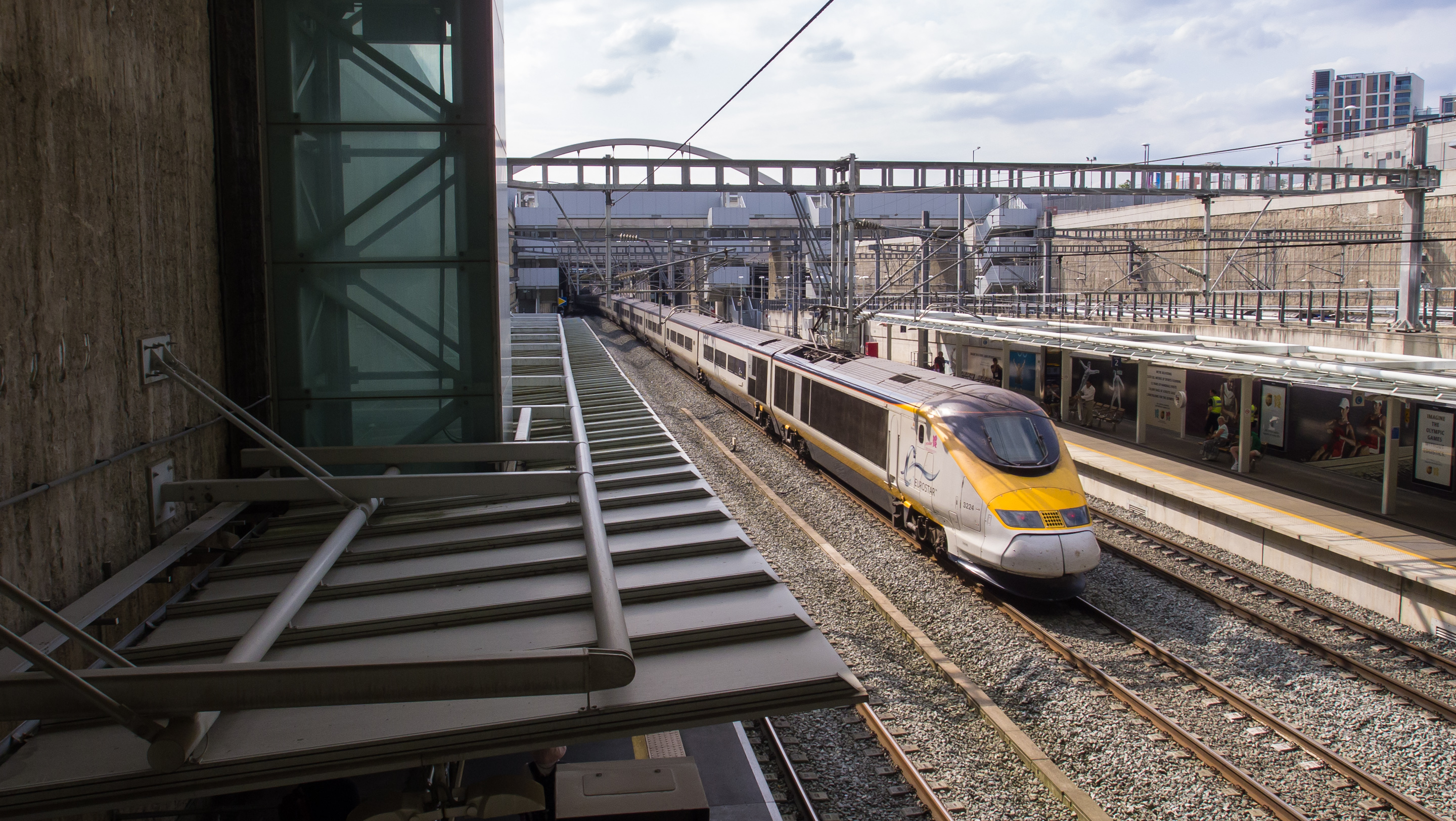
- A view of the station with a Eurostar train on the through line. Domestic platforms are in the middle.
- Interactive map of Stratford International

General information
- Location: Stratford (HS1)/East Village (DLR)
- Local authority: London Borough of Newham
- Managed by: Network Rail (High Speed) for HS1 Ltd; Docklands Light Railway
- Owners: London and Continental Railways; Transport for London
- Station code: SFA
- Number of platforms: 6 (4 National Rail- 2 in public use, 2 DLR)
- Accessible: Yes
- Fare zone: 2 and 3 (DLR services only; special fares apply on National Rail)

DLR annual boardings and alightings
- 2021: ▲2.624 million
- 2022: ▲3.890 million
- 2023: ▲4.440 million
- 2024: ▼3.78 million
- 2025: ▼3.74 million

National Rail annual entry and exit
- 2020–21: ▼0.741 million
- 2021–22: ▲1.949 million
- 2022–23: ▲2.517 million
- 2023–24: ▲2.543 million
- Interchange: 0.150 million
- 2024–25: ▲2.739 million
- Interchange: ▲0.214 million

Railway companies
- Original company: London and Continental Railways

Key dates
- 30 November 2009: Opened (National Rail)
- 31 August 2011: Opened (DLR)

Other information
- External links: Departures; Facilities
- Coordinates: 51.5448°N 0.0086°W

Stratford International is a National Rail station in Stratford and a separate Docklands Light Railway (DLR) station nearby, located in East Village in London. Despite its name, no international services currently stop at the station; plans for it to be served by Eurostar trains never came to fruition. However, there are plans to use it as a terminus for Eurostar competitor Gemini Trains from 2029 (see International services). The National Rail platforms are served by Southeastern trains on the High Speed 1 route originating at London St Pancras International (which is served by Eurostar). On the DLR, it is a terminus – one of seven end-of-the-line termini – for local services via Canning Town and London City Airport.

== History ==
Construction of the National Rail station was completed in 2006, but it only opened in 2009 to serve Southeastern services on HS1. In 2011, an extension of the DLR was opened to connect Stratford International to the wider London public transport network, and to the main Stratford station to the south.

The DLR station is physically separate and located just across the road from the HS1 station. Oyster cards and contactless payment cards are valid for travel to and from Stratford International, with the DLR station in London fare zone 2 and 3, but special fares apply at the HS1 station.

== Design ==
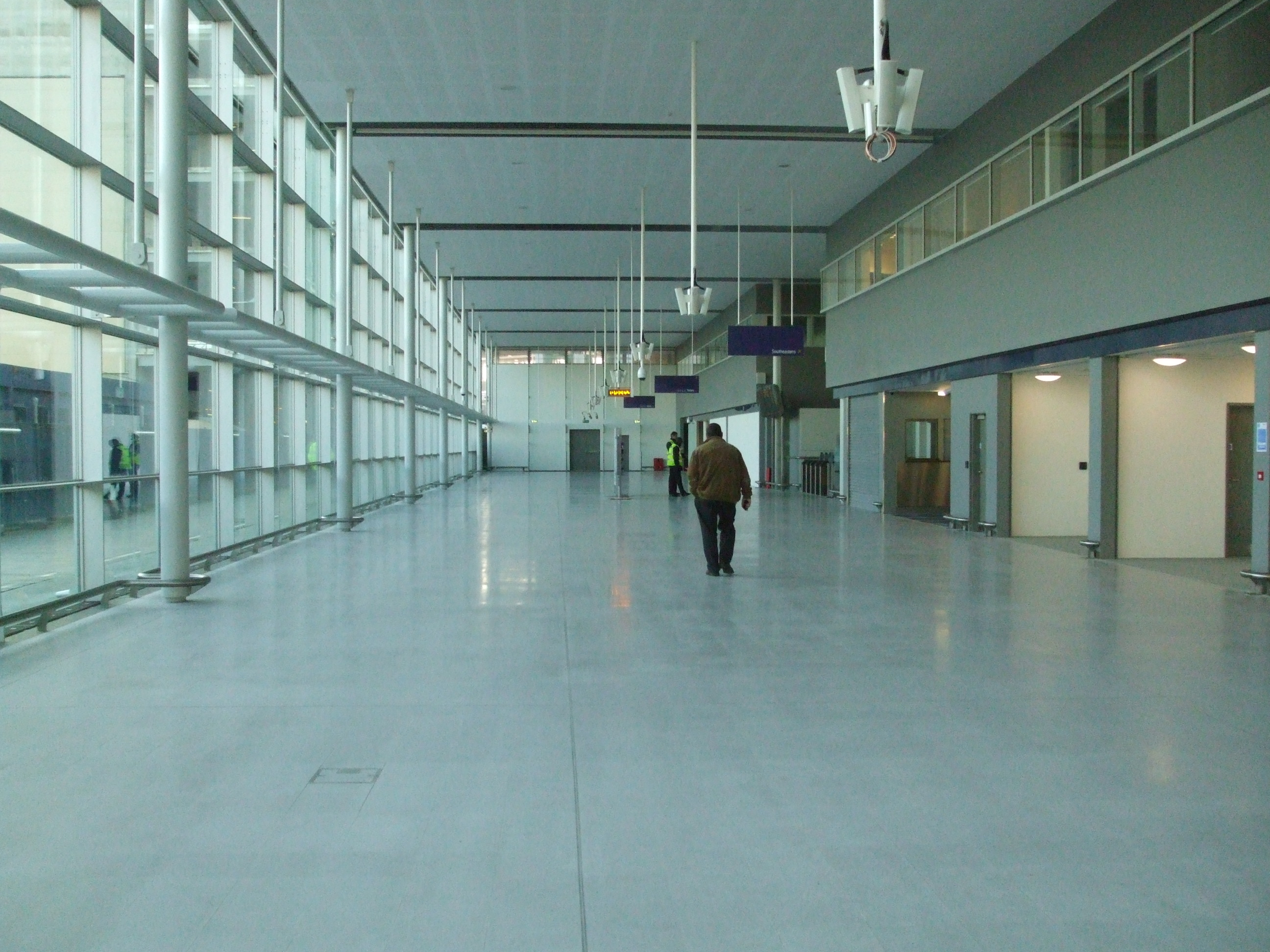
High Speed 1 station concourse

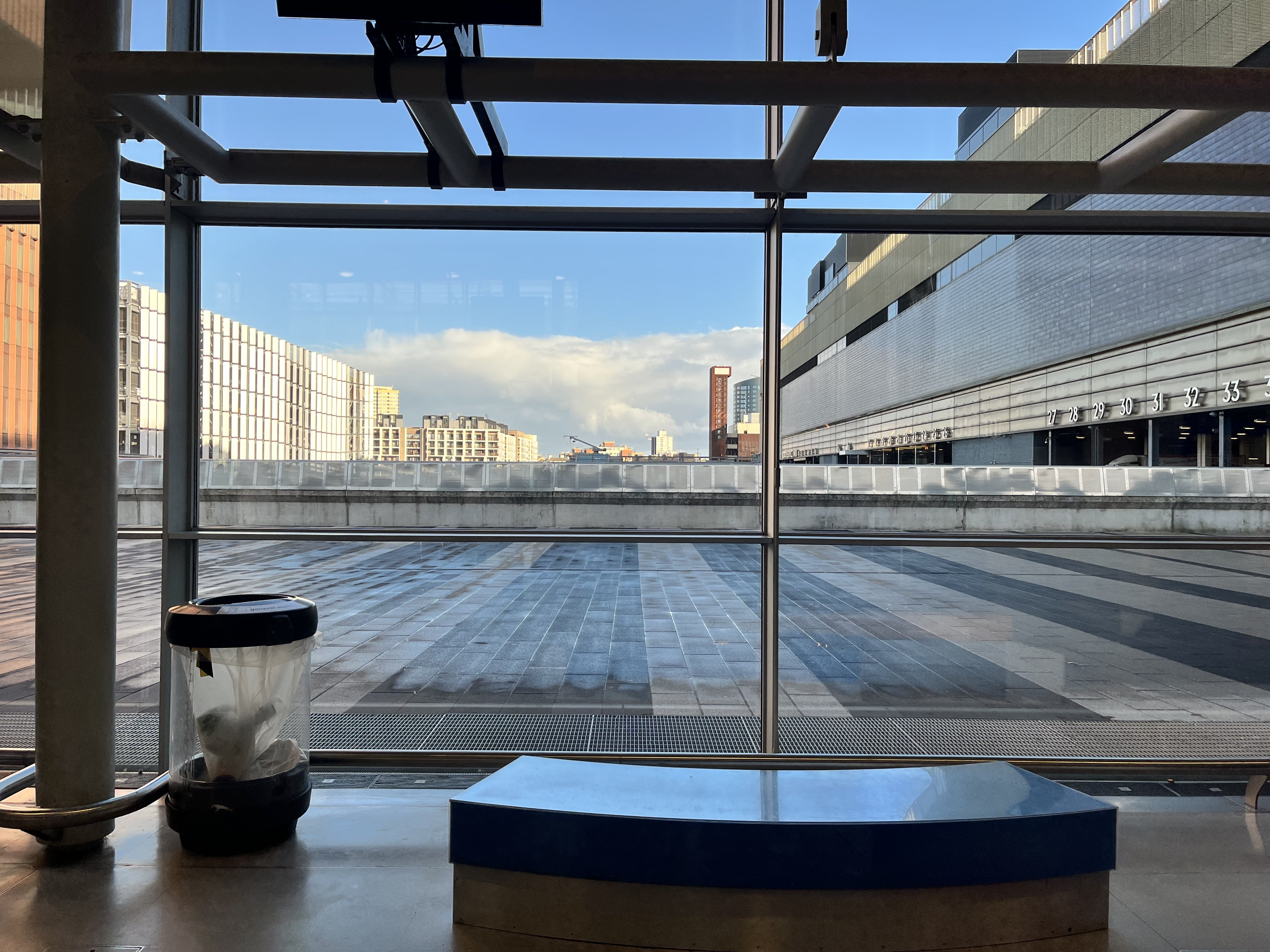
View from the station

The four-platform HS1 station is built within "Stratford Box", a 1.1-kilometre (0.7 mi) concrete-sided cutting, meaning the station is located below ground level. It is located near the centre of the Queen Elizabeth Olympic Park, adjacent to the Westfield Stratford City shopping centre.

The station is on the High Speed 1 railway between London St Pancras International and Ebbsfleet International. As the station lies just inside the eastern boundary of the London Olympic Park, much of the surrounding land was little more than a construction site until mid-2012.

The tracks descend into a tunnel at both ends of the station as its platforms are closer to the surface than the tunnels; some of the platforms have a noticeable dip along their length at the east end. Stratford International has four platforms in the station box: two at the outer edges and two shorter ones forming a central island. The main line through tracks run down each side of the station between the adjacent platforms. There is a waiting room on the island platforms but not on the outer platforms. In the centre of the station is a single-track inclined viaduct, rising to the east end along and above the length of the island platforms. This is to allow out-of-service trains to leave the station box and reach the depot at Temple Mills.

35 metres (114 ft 10 in) beyond the eastern portals, the tunnels pass just underneath the Central line tunnels curving north from Stratford. The bottom invert of each Central line tunnel is only 4.3 metres (14 ft 1 in) and 8.0 metres (26 ft 3 in) above the high-speed running tunnels.

The station was not authorised by the Channel Tunnel Rail Link Act 1996 and an order under the Transport and Works Act 1992 had to be made to allow for its construction. Construction work began on the station in July 2001. Construction of the station was completed in 2006, with the station opening in 2009.

Similar in design to Ebbsfleet International, the station was designed by architect Mark Fisher, working under Alastair Lansley – the chief architect on the Channel Tunnel Rail Link project. Fisher described the station as "a big, generous light-filled bridge of steel and glass crossing the tracks and spanning the box". Internal finishings of the station were designed by Jestico + Whiles.

== Services ==
=== National Rail ===
Southeastern operates all trains serving the High Speed 1 station. The full service started on 13 December 2009 using Class 395 EMUs.

The typical off-peak service in trains per hour is:

- 4 tph to London St Pancras International
- 2 tph to Faversham via Gravesend of which 1 continues to Ramsgate
- 1 tph to Ramsgate via Dover Priory
- 1 tph to Margate via Canterbury West

Additional services, including two daily return services between London St Pancras International and Maidstone West call at the station during the peak hours.

During the 2012 Olympic Games, a service of eight trains an hour ran between St Pancras and Ebbsfleet, calling at Stratford, replacing the high speed service. Two of these would be extended to Ashford and one to Faversham. Between 11pm and 1am the service between St Pancras and Ebbsfleet would be increased to twelve per hour. To enable the domestic services to stop at platforms previously designed for Eurostar trains, the platforms had to be raised.

=== Docklands Light Railway ===
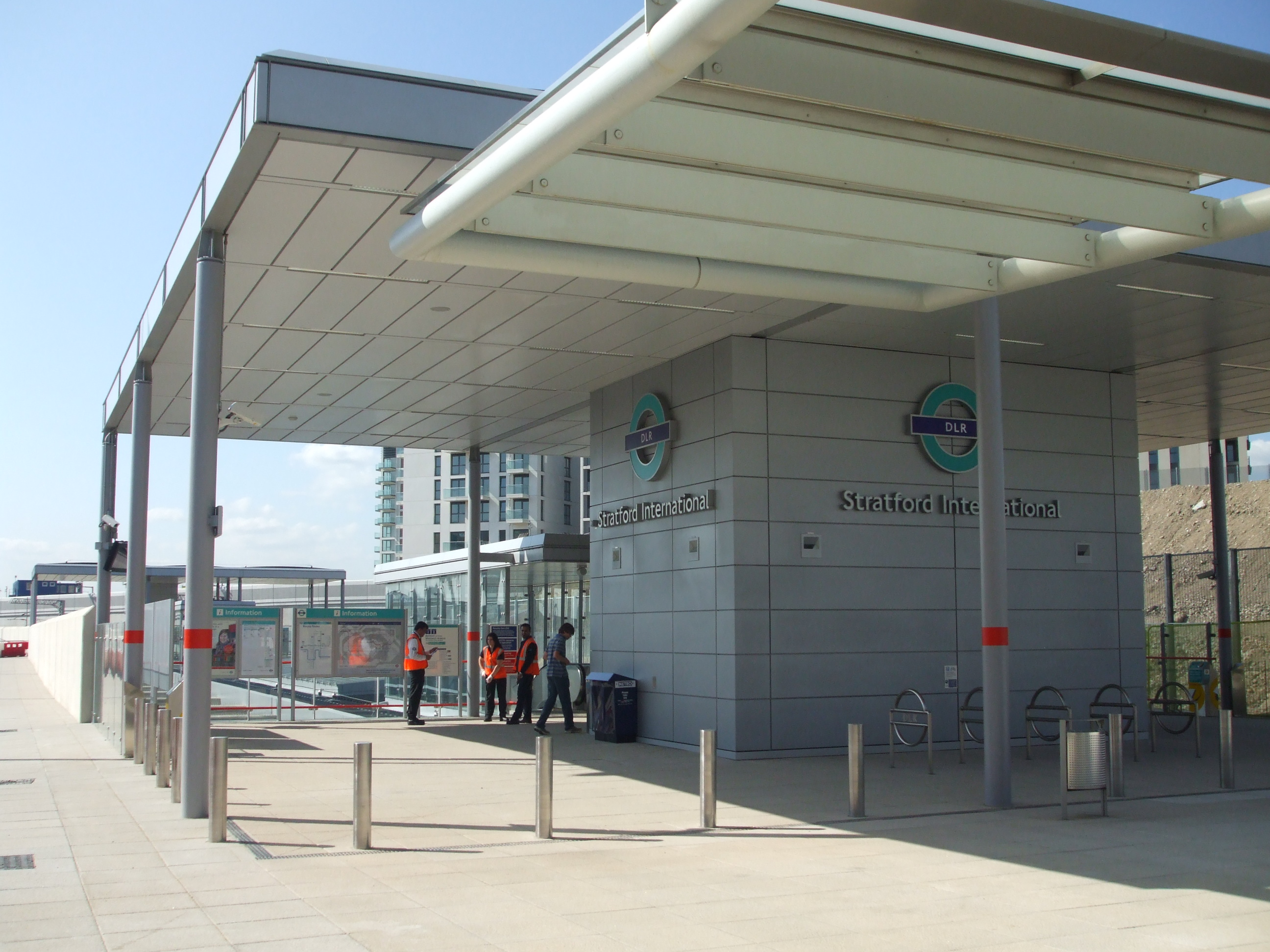
DLR station soon after opening in 2011

The Docklands Light Railway extension to Stratford International consists of a short new line from Stratford International to Stratford station, then continues along the former North London Line route between Stratford and Canning Town, stopping at Stratford High Street (on the site of the original Stratford Market railway station), Abbey Road, West Ham and Star Lane before joining the existing DLR branches from Canning Town to Woolwich Arsenal. Its opening was originally planned for July 2010, but was delayed to 31 August 2011.

The typical off-peak service in trains per hour from Stratford International is 6 tph to and from Woolwich Arsenal via Canning Town. Additional services run to and from the station during the peak hours, increasing the service up to 8 tph to and from the station.

Preceding station	National Rail	Following station
London St Pancras International	Southeastern High Speed 1	Ebbsfleet International
DLR
Terminus	Docklands Light Railway	Stratford towards Woolwich Arsenal

== Connections ==
London Bus routes 97, 108, 308, 339 and night route N205 serve the station.

== International services ==
The original intended purpose of Stratford International station was to act as the London stop for regional Eurostar trains bypassing St Pancras and continuing to other destinations in Britain. However, these services did not come into being, and Rob Holden, chief executive of LCR and deputy chairman of Eurostar, stated that, "stopping a high-speed train seven minutes out of St Pancras is less than ideal", leaving only the domestic Southeastern trains serving the station. Critics derided the station as a white elephant.

By the time Southeastern was serving the station, the Transport Secretary Lord Adonis was urged by Sir Robin Wales, former Mayor of Newham, and Peter Miller, Westfield Stratford City's CEO, to order Eurostar to stop at the station. John Burton, development director of Westfield's Stratford City mall, said domestic services were a "poor substitute" for Eurostar: "International commuters are essential in order to realise the vision of a major metropolitan centre for east London. Direct international services will be a key part of the legacy of the Olympics."

Miller and local politicians including former Mayor of London Ken Livingstone warned that international services would be vital for the success of the Stratford City scheme and the regeneration of East London. London Assembly member Andrew Boff has suggested that rail operators considering running international trains should be forced to stop at Stratford International as part of their High Speed 1 line access. Eurostar did not agree to stop at the station during the 2012 London Olympics.

There are several other potential operators that may use the station for international services. In 2010 Deutsche Bahn proposed a London-Frankfurt service, but this was later abandoned.

In August 2025, the start-up Gemini Trains, co-operating with Uber Trains, confirmed that it has plans to use the station as a terminus for services to Paris, Brussels and Lille, projected to start in 2029

In October 2026, the government announced it would support plans to enable international rail services to the station.

== Access and interchange ==
Access to the station was, at design stage, to be via a new link road to Waterden Road, which linked in turn to the A12 at Lea Interchange and south to Carpenters Road. This link road was constructed and a new signal junction installed on Waterden Road but never opened. However, these roads were stopped up in mid-2007 to enable the construction of the Olympic Park.

When opened it was located adjacent to the construction sites of both the London Olympic Park and Westfield Stratford City shopping centre which prevented pedestrian access; during local redevelopment work a temporary bus service linked Stratford International to nearby Stratford. The DLR station opened on 31 August 2011, and Westfield Stratford City on 13 September 2011. The bus service ran until 20 September 2011.
