= Southwick Hill Tunnel =

Road tunnel to the north of Southwick, West Sussex, England

Coordinates: 50°51′17″N 0°14′19″W

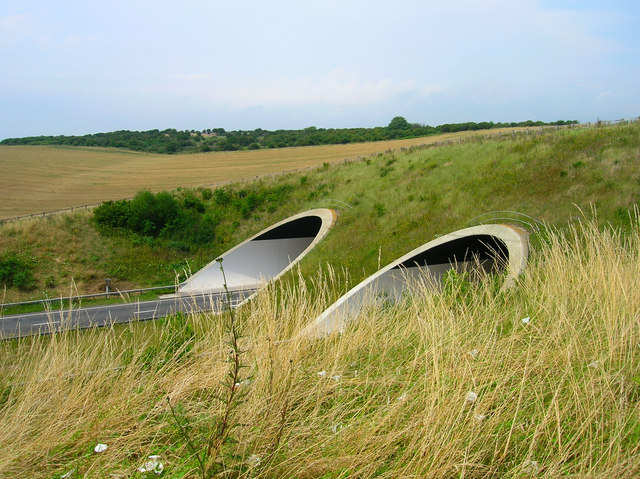
Western end of the tunnel, 2007

The Southwick Hill Tunnel is a 490-metre (1,610 ft) twin-bore road tunnel to the north of Southwick, England.

The tunnel was opened in early 1996 as part of the A27 Brighton bypass and carries the road under Southwick Hill. The border between West Sussex and the unitary authority of Brighton and Hove is close to the eastern entrance of the tunnel. Non-motorised traffic (e.g. pedestrians, cyclists) and mopeds under 50 cc are prohibited from using the tunnel, with a warning sign indicating an alternative route.

== Engineering ==
The tunnel was built through the Newhaven Chalk layer using the New Austrian Tunnelling method. The structure uses shotcrete and untensioned bolts.

== See also ==
- List of tunnels in the United Kingdom
