= New Cross to Finsbury Market Cable Tunnel =

Utility tunnel in London, England

Coordinates: 51°29′2.76″N 0°3′31.04″W

Location
- Country: United Kingdom
- Province: Greater London

Ownership information
- Owner: UK Power Networks
- Operator: UK Power Networks

Construction information
- Contractors: J. Murphy & Sons
- Construction cost: £27m
- Commissioned: 2017

Technical information
- Type: Underground tunnel
- Current type: AC
- Total length: 5.7 km (3.5 mi)
- AC voltage: 132 kV

The New Cross to Finsbury Market Cable Tunnel is a 5.7-kilometre (3.5 mi) long, 2.85-metre (9 ft 4 in) diameter tunnel beneath London which carries power distribution cables for UK Power Networks as part of the London power distribution network. It was built between 2009 and 2017 by J. Murphy & Sons.

The tunnel runs at a depth of 25 to 35 metres (82 to 115 ft), from New Cross substation in Southwark to Finsbury Market substation in Hackney, close to the edge of the City of London. Along the route, it connects substations at Osborn Street in Whitechapel and Wellclose Square in Wapping, passing beneath the River Thames downstream of Tower Bridge.

The tunnel carries cables operating at a voltage of 132 kV with a capacity of 400 MW - enough to power 130,000 homes.

== See also ==
- Elstree to St. John's Wood Cable Tunnel
- Lower Lea Valley Cable Tunnels
- London Power Tunnels
