= Saltash Tunnel =

Road tunnel in Cornwall, England

Coordinates: 50.41161°N 4.21496°W

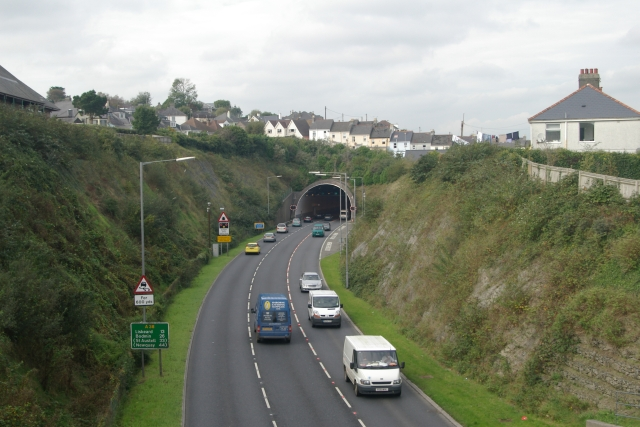
- The Eastern portal of the Saltash Tunnel.
- Interactive map of Saltash Tunnel

Overview
- Location: West of the Tamar Bridge, Saltash, Cornwall, UK
- Status: Active
- Route: A38

Operation
- Opened: 1988
- Owner: National Highways

Technical
- Length: 410 m (1,350 ft)
- Operating speed: 30 mph (48 km/h)

The Saltash Tunnel is a road tunnel on the A38 at Saltash in Cornwall, UK, and was opened in 1988.

The central lane operates as a reversible lane to cope with holiday and rush hour traffic and the speed limit is 30 mph. The tunnel is used by more than 38,000 motorists per day and is 410 m long. It was designed by Mott, Hay and Anderson, built by Balfour Beatty, and has a design life of at least 100 years.

== Construction ==
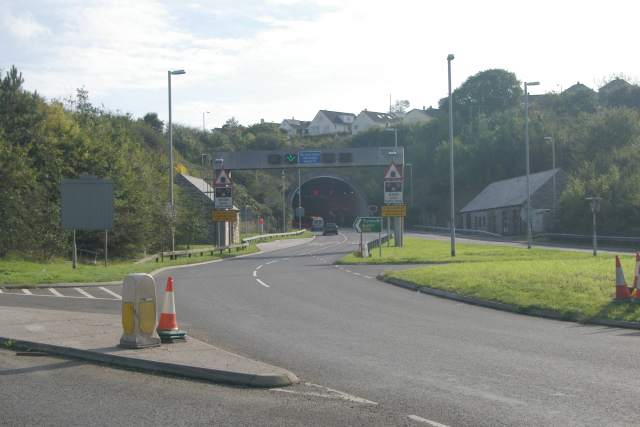
The Western portal

During construction of the tunnel, a problem was encountered with flooding due to the saturation of the surrounding rocks. The resultant flow of water was channelled through the tunnel, hidden behind the unreinforced insitu concrete lining. Within a few months, this lining had begun to crack, and water entered the part of the tunnel visible to traffic. Although no structural problems were found, the water staining on the lining gave the impression of a poorly built tunnel. This issue was commented upon in Parliament by the local MP, Colin Breed, and a £7.4 million renovation project was contracted to Skanska to provide a new tunnel lining and improvements to the electrical system.

== See also ==
- List of tunnels in the United Kingdom
