= Lower Lea Valley Cable Tunnels =

Power cable tunnels in east London

Location
- Country: UK
- Province: Greater London

Ownership information
- Owner: National Grid plc, UK Power Networks

Construction information
- Contractors: J. Murphy & Sons
- Construction started: 2006
- Commissioned: 2008

Technical information
- Type: Underground tunnel
- Current type: AC
- Total length: 6 km (3.7 mi)
- AC voltage: 400 kV, 132 kV

The Lower Lea Valley Cable Tunnels, known as the PLUG (Power Line Under Ground) Project during construction, are a pair of 6 km cable tunnels running beneath the lower Lea Valley in east London. Constructed at a cost of £130m ahead of the 2012 London Olympic Games, they are owned by National Grid plc and UK Power Networks.

The two tunnels run south from Hackney substation to West Ham substation at a depth of 20-30m below ground. One tunnel is 4.15m in diameter and carries a 400 kV circuit as part of the National Grid, while the other tunnel is 2.82m in diameter and carries a 132 kV circuit as part of the London power distribution network.

The UK Power Networks tunnel also features an 850 m spur tunnel to link it to the substation in Bow.

The tunnels replaced two over ground power lines which crossed the area which would be turned into the Queen Elizabeth Olympic Park. The cable tunnels were one of the first major projects for the London Olympics, and was critical to allow subsequent work on the Olympic Park to continue on schedule. After the tunnels were commissioned, the 52 pylons and 80 km of overhead wires were removed and recycled. More than 200,000 cubic metres of spoil was generated, the majority of which was reused in the construction of the Olympic Park.

== See also ==
- Elstree to St. John's Wood Cable Tunnel
- New Cross to Finsbury Market Cable Tunnel
- London Power Tunnels
