= Gemini Trains =

British train operating company

- Type: Private
- Industry: Rail transport
- Founded: 2025; 1 year ago
- Headquarters: London, United Kingdom
- Key people: Adrian Quine (CEO); Tony Berkeley (chairman); Tom Fielden (CFO)
- Number of employees: 6 (2025)
- Website: https://geminitrains.com/

Gemini Trains is a company which plans to run a high-speed rail service between London and Continental Europe, using the Channel Tunnel, and becoming a direct competitor with Eurostar. They plan to run a service from Stratford International, through Ebbsfleet International, to Paris and Brussels.

Gemini has partnered with Uber, who will co-brand the trains and allow users to book journeys through their app.

== Routes ==
Unlike Eurostar, which runs its services from St Pancras International, Gemini plan to start their journeys at Stratford International instead, which was built for international services and includes facilities such as passport control, although no international services currently run there. Adrian Quine, CEO of Gemini, described Stratford as "a bit of a blank canvas". According to Quine, Stratford was chosen as it is less congested than St Pancras, which he said is "becoming increasingly and unpleasantly crowded in the international departures area at peak times". All services will call at Ebbsfleet in Kent, where the Eurostar used to stop until 2020.

The initial planned services will run to Paris Nord and Brussels-Midi, with a planned extension to Cologne in the future. Gemini Trains plan to introduce their new services by 2029.

== Partnerships ==
In 2025, Gemini Trains announced several partnerships with different companies. They chose Siemens Mobility for the manufacturing of rolling stock, using the new Velaro Novo design. Gemini also announced that Rock Rail would be helping to finance the new fleet, and that Uber would co-brand the trains, allowing users to book tickets directly through the Uber app.

== Competition with Eurostar ==
Gemini Trains are one of several companies who plan to run cross-channel services in direct competition with Eurostar. Others include Virgin Rail Group, who plan to run London–Paris, London–Brussels and London–Amsterdam services starting in 2030, and Evolyn, partnered with Italy's Ferrovie dello Stato Italiane, who plan to introduce cross-channel services by 2029.

In 2025, several competing companies applied to use Temple Mills Depot, the only depot in the UK which can house larger trains that are used in continental Europe that is connected to HS1, currently used by Eurostar. Virgin's application was accepted, while those of Gemini and Evolyn were rejected.

== See also ==
- Channel Tunnel
- Eurostar
- High Speed 1
