= Whitehaven Tunnel =

Railway tunnel in Cumbria, England

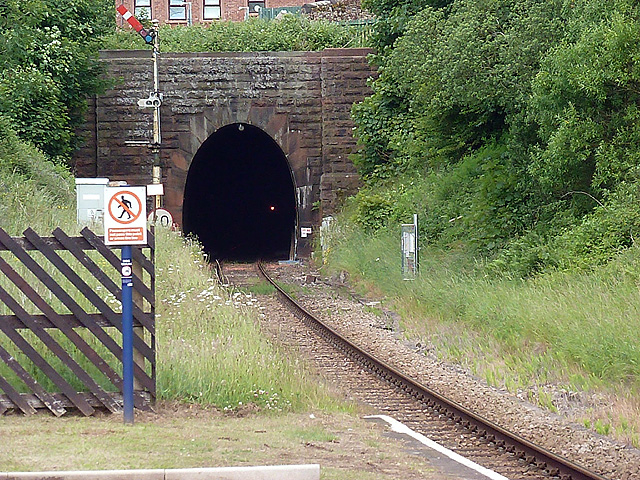
- Southern portal of the tunnel
- Interactive map of Whitehaven Tunnel

Overview
- Other name: Bransty Tunnel
- Line: Cumbrian Coast Line
- Location: Whitehaven, Cumbria, England
- Coordinates: 54.547°N 3.582°W
- OS grid reference: NX977179
- Status: Closed (temporarily)

Operation
- Work began: 1850
- Opened: 30 September 1952
- Rebuilt: 1932–1958 (see text)
- Owner: Network Rail

Technical
- Length: 1,283 yards (1,173 m)
- No. of tracks: 1
- Track gauge: 4 ft 8 1/2 in (1,435 mm) standard gauge
- Operating speed: 40 miles per hour (64 km/h) (normal); 20 miles per hour (32 km/h) 2022-2025

The Whitehaven Tunnel (also known as Bransty Tunnel), is a railway tunnel on the Cumbrian Coast Line linking Whitehaven with Corkickle in Cumbria, England. Work on the tunnel started in 1850, with it opening in September 1852, and between 1932 and 1958, it was shortened at the southern end after re-lining works. The tunnel was closed temporarily in 2025 due to water from defunct mines leaking into the tunnel and then draining away into the harbour at Whitehaven. It is expected to re-open in 2026.

== History ==
Construction of the tunnel by the Whitehaven and Furness Junction Railway as a link line to the Whitehaven Junction Railway was started in 1850, and it opened to all traffic on 30 September 1852, but the local newspaper observed that freight was using the tunnel by 18 September 1852. Permission was granted under the Whitehaven and Furness Junction Railway (Whitehaven Extension and Kirksanton Deviation) Act 1846 (9 & 10 Vict. c. cccxx), with a clause in the act that did not permit the substitution of a tunnel for a cutting without the consent of Lord Lonsdale. The tunnel was built on a slight curve (going north-westwards) and several gradients, and was originally 16 feet 8 inches (5.08 m) high, and at its widest it was 13 feet 6 inches (4.11 m). Progress in building the tunnel was slow due to the number of old mineshafts in the area, and it was lined with red sandstone and brick. The narrowness of the tunnel prevented sleeper carriages from going through, so the overnight service from Euston to Workington detached these carriages at Corkickle, before proceeding north. When the station at Corkickle was opened, it meant that the tunnel had a station at each end; Corkickle at the south, opened in December 1855, and Whitehaven (originally named Bransty) at the northern end. David Joy marvelled at the irony of "..the longest railway tunnel in England's most mountainous county was almost at sea level."

When the Whitehaven, Cleator and Egremont Railway opened in 1857, trains ran through the tunnel to terminate at Bransty, but this working soon ceased as the Whitehaven and Furness Junction Railway demanded 2 shillings for every train that used the tunnel. Passenger trains using the tunnel had to go further north than the original station at Bransty, and then reverse opposite William Pit into the platforms. This situation was changed when platforms were built at the northern tunnel portal in December 1874.

In May 1886, whilst a goods train was travelling north through the tunnel, the last few wagons and guard's van became detached form the train and stopped within the tunnel. The stranded wagons were then involved in a collision with the next passenger train northwards (travelling in the same direction on the single line), and this resulted in a crash at around 14 miles per hour (23 km/h), injuring 30-40 passengers and badly scalding the driver of the train. The fireman was killed in the crash, with Quayle suggesting he was riding on the buffer beam of the locomotive, sanding the tracks. Although an electric telegraph had been laid through the tunnel in 1852, it was not working, and the company relied on a pilotman to make sure that trains were safely guided through the tunnel. The tunnel was closed for some months in 1874 due to a "90-foot (27 m) section bulging inwards", although some freight was allowed through hauled by engines with cut-down cabs. In 1882, the maximum dimensions of loads allowed through the tunnel were 8 feet (2.4 m) wide, and 12 feet (3.7 m) from the rail to the centre of the roof of the tunnel. In 1890, new rail, baseplates and ties were used which were physically lower than the old track allowing a further 3 inches (76 mm) of headroom.

By the 1920, the tunnel bore was distorted in places, and it was continually having to be repaired. In 1932, the London, Midland and Scottish Railway started a process of re-lining the tunnel, at a rate of 8 feet (2.4 m) every three weeks; they estimated that at that rate, it would take four years, but it actually was not completely re-lined until 1956, though work ceased for eight years at the outbreak of the Second World War. The tunnel could only be closed for five hours overnight, and the works involved opening the southern portal into a cutting, curtailing the tunnel length from 1,333 yards (1,219 m) to 1,291 yards 2 feet (1,181 m).

Due to the tunnel being flooded with minewater, it was closed for repairs in July 2025. Minewater has been flooding the tunnel since 2022, and then draining from the tunnel into the harbour, discolouring the water in the harbour. The water from the harbour has been tested and it revealed elevated levels of iron and manganese. Network Rail found that a prolonged closure was necessary as the ground in the tunnel could not take the weight of the machinery it needed to work on the tunnel, so groundworks stabilisation needed to take place first. The contaminated water has also caused additional wear on the rails inside the tunnel. The movement of nuclear waste through the tunnel was also questioned as the trains had to proceed at 10 miles per hour (16 km/h) to avoid acidic minewater being splashed onto the freight wagons. The posted speed limit within the tunnel is 40 miles per hour (64 km/h), but this was restricted to 20 miles per hour (32 km/h) between 2022 and 2025 due to the floodwater within the tunnel.

Whilst the tunnel itself is not a listed structure, the five air shafts are all listed at Grade II.

== Tunnel length ==
Various different lengths have been claimed for the tunnel; the original bore was listed as being 1,333 yards (1,219 m), but Joy states 1,330 yards (1,220 m) in one publication, whilst maintaining it is 1,333 yards (1,219 m) in another. Alan Blower states the tunnel to be 1,316 yards (1,203 m), and Bairstow states that after the works which finished in 1958, the tunnel was 33 yards (30 m) shorter, which made it 1,300 yards (1,200 m) long. During the ongoing works to repair the tunnel between 2025 and 2026, Network Rail stated the structure is "[a] circa 1km tunnel, and the railway data website states it is 1,292 yards (1,181 m) long.

Modern-day sources agree the length is 1,283 yards (1,173 m).

== See also ==
- Blea Moor Tunnel
- Rise Hill Tunnel
