= Blea Moor Tunnel =

Railway tunnel in Cumbria and Yorkshire, England

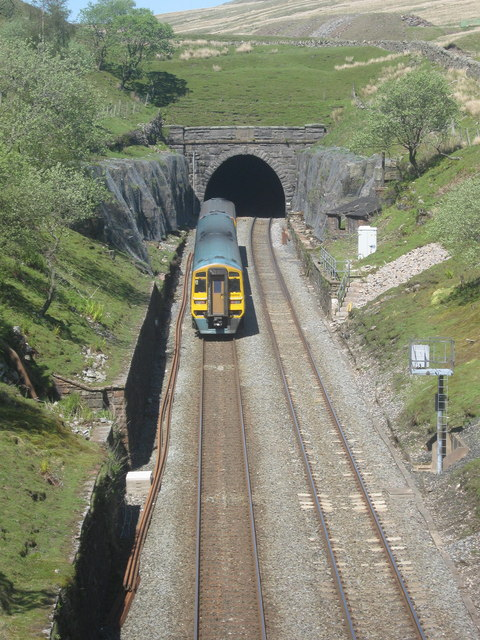
- The southern portal of Blea Moor Tunnel
- Interactive map of Blea Moor Tunnel

Overview
- Line: Settle to Carlisle Line
- Location: Cumbria
- Coordinates: 54°14′24.72″N 2°21′29.88″W
- Start: 1872
- End: 1875

Operation
- Owner: Network Rail

Technical
- Length: 2,629 yards (2,404 m)

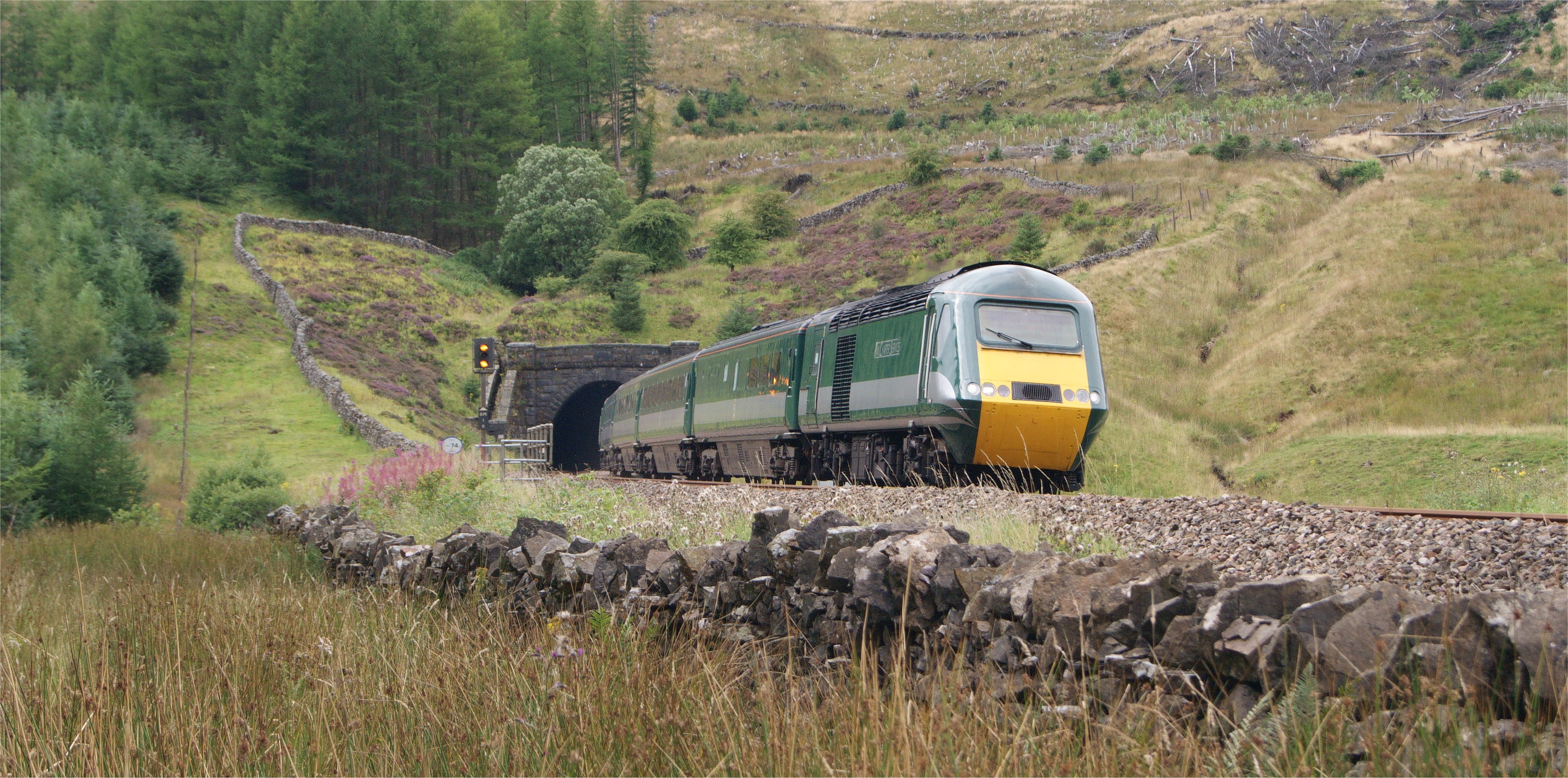
A fully refurbished, all first class, HST 125, Rail Charter Services, emerges from the North portal of Blea Moor Tunnel, August 2021

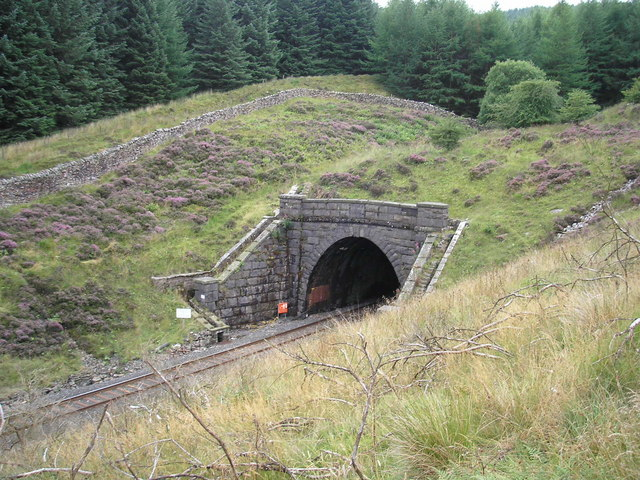
The northern entrance to the tunnel

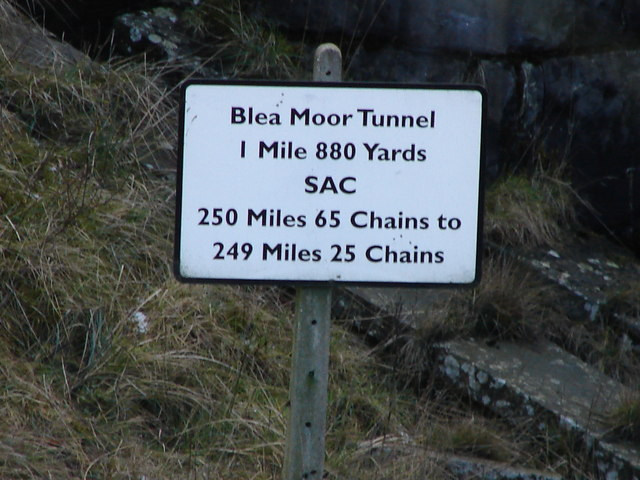
Sign at tunnel entrance

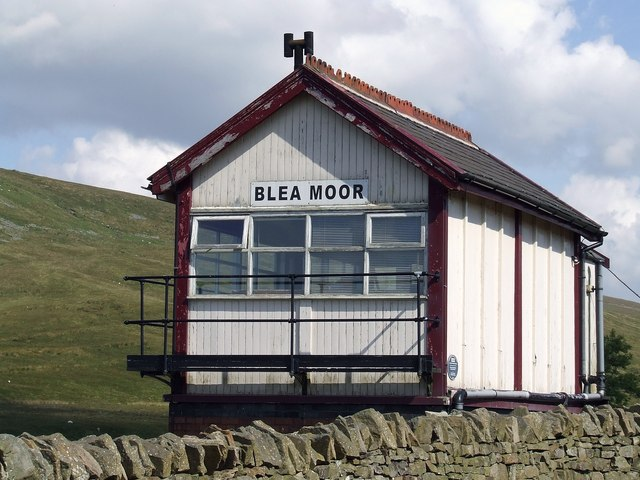
The isolated Blea Moor signal box, near the tunnel entrance

Blea Moor Tunnel is a 1 1/2-mile (2.4 km) railway tunnel located between Ribblehead Viaduct and Dent railway station in England. It is the longest tunnel on the Settle-Carlisle Line, being almost twice as long as the second longest tunnel, Rise Hill Tunnel.

== History ==
Built by the Midland Railway, it took more than four years to complete. Construction started in 1872, with dynamite transported from Carlisle and Newcastle in carts to the construction site. The wages on offer to the miners who dug the tunnel were 5s (equivalent to £24.44 in 2025) to 5s 6d (equivalent to £26.50 in 2025) per day.

It was completed in 1875 at a cost of £109,000 (equivalent to £10,870,000 in 2025).

It passes some 500 feet (150 m) below the moor after which it was named, and was built with the aid of seven separate construction shafts sunk from the moor above. This permitted sixteen separate gangs of workers to be used during construction (one from each open end and two from the foot of each of the shafts). Four of these were subsequently filled in but three were retained for ventilation purposes and are still used as such today (with occasional ice accumulation problems). At one point of the track's history, steam locomotives were tested for their worthiness by driving them through this tunnel.

The line from the south enters the tunnel on a rising 1% (1 in 100) gradient (the "Long Drag" beginning back at Settle Junction), but an initial summit is reached at the 1100 ft contour just under half a mile from the southern portal. From there, the rest of the tunnel is on a shallow descending gradient of 1 in 440 towards Dent Head.

In April 1952 a passenger train derailed shortly after exiting the tunnel due to a broken brake rod on the locomotive tender fouling the points. The use of rolling stock with Buckeye couplings and welded underframes was praised in preventing telescoping of the coaches and thus there were no deaths.

== Traffic ==
Any train that goes the full length of the Settle & Carlisle line goes through Blea Moor Tunnel. This includes passenger trains, all run by Northern (eight each way per day in the 2023-24 timetable), various special excursions (some hauled by steam locomotives) and the many goods trains. A short distance south of the tunnel is Blea Moor Sidings signal box, which supervises the line through the tunnel and also over the adjacent Ribblehead viaduct. Since 2016, the goods loop there has also been used several times a day by stone trains from the quarries at Arcow and Horton (both of which now have siding connections to the northbound main line) to reverse direction before returning south via Settle and Hellifield to various stone distribution terminals in the Leeds, Manchester and Liverpool areas.

== Train simulators ==
You can go through the Blea Moor Tunnel either with Microsoft Train Simulator, Trainz Classics 3 or Train Simulator Classic.

== Location ==
- Southern portal: 54.2319°N 2.3673°W
- Northern portal: 54.2497°N 2.3465°W

== See also ==
- Infrastructure of the Settle–Carlisle line
- Whitehaven Tunnel
