= Legend of the Parson and Clerk =

Story from Devon folklore

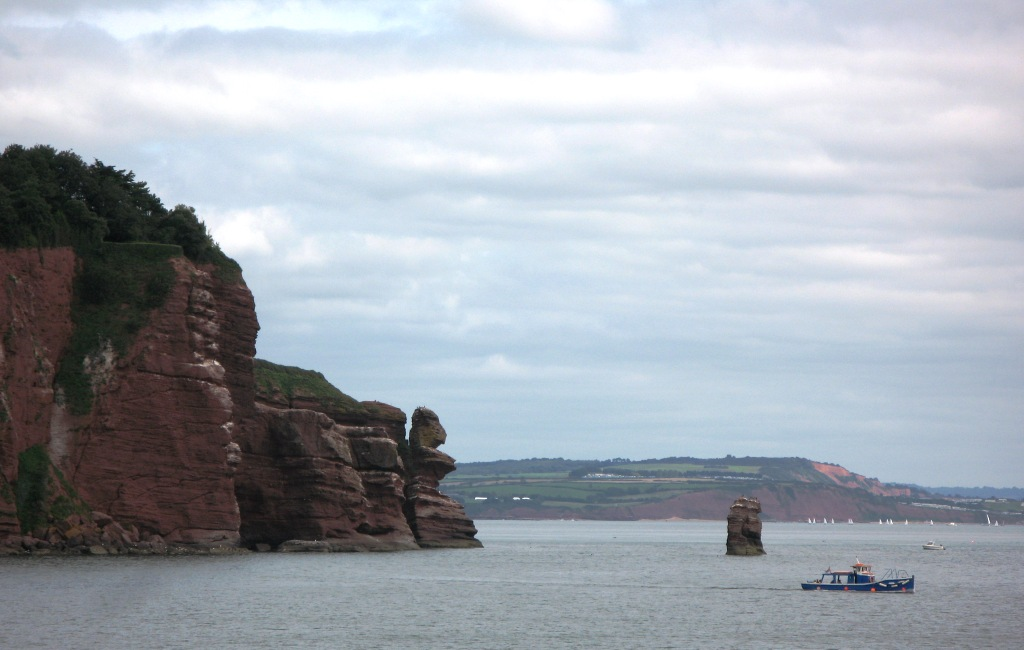
The Parson and Clerk (centre) with Shag Rock visible (right)

The legend of the Parson and Clerk is a story from Devon folklore. The tale revolves around a clergyman, his clerk and their encounter with the Devil, with the setting being near a natural arch located in proximity to the towns of Teignmouth and Dawlish, Devon, England. Along the coast towards Dawlish where the railway runs through the Parson's tunnel can be seen the twin rock stacks of the Parson and his Clerk.

== Geology ==
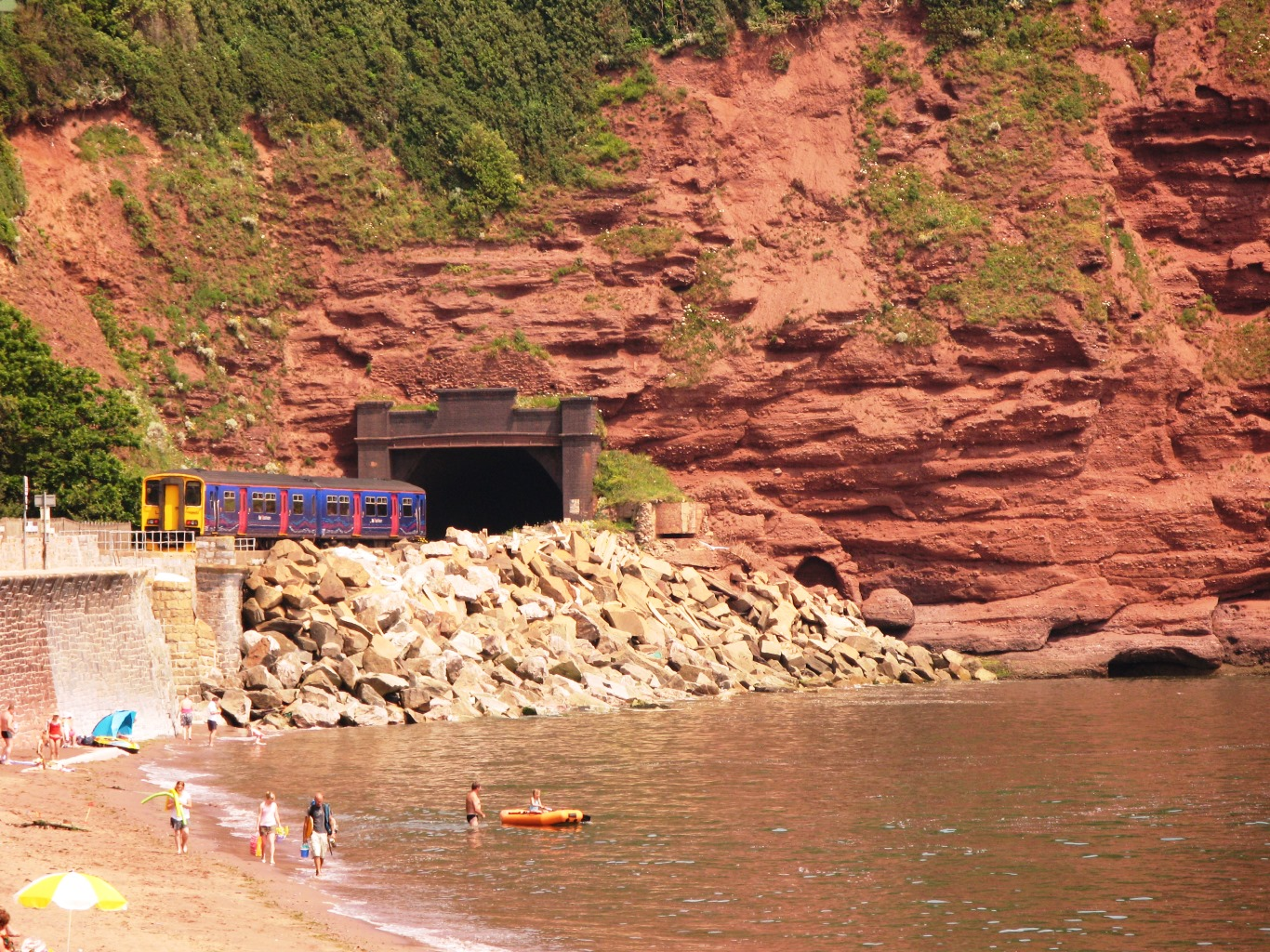
Parson's Tunnel

The Parson and Clerk are composed of relatively friable sedimentary Teignmouth Breccia of Permian age, as are all the nearby cliffs. Their soft rock layers are preserved from erosion by the harder "caprock" that was deposited above their strata. A further outer rock, Shag Rock, lost most of its height in a storm in 1984, and then lost its "head" in a storm in January 2003.

The Parson and Clerk and the cliffs are easily viewed from the South West Coast Path which follows the Exeter to Newton Abbot railway line along the coast between Parson's Tunnel and Teignmouth.

== Legend ==
Many versions of the story exist. Robert Hunt (in 1881) and Sarah Hewett (1900) relates that a certain Bishop of Exeter fell ill and came to Dawlish to restore his health. However, an ambitious local priest aimed to succeed to the See in the event of his superior's demise.

The priest's guide was his clerk, and they often made the journey to check on the condition of the bishop. One night, in a terrible storm, whilst crossing Haldon moor they lost their way and found themselves miles from the correct path. The priest in his frustration abused his clerk with the words I would rather have the devil himself, than you, for a guide. At that moment a horseman rode by and volunteered to be their guide.

After a few miles they came across a brilliantly lit mansion and were invited by their guide to enter and partake of his hospitality. They enjoyed a sumptuous repast and in the midst of the merriment the news arrived that the bishop was dead. Eager to secure his chance for promotion the priest prepared to leave, together with the clerk and the guide; however the horses refused to move. After liberal use of his whip and spurs the priest cried Devil take the brutes, upon which the guide exclaimed Thank you, sir and shouted Gee up. The horses galloped over the cliff, carrying the parson and the clerk with them. The devil turned them both to stone, facing forever seaward, monuments to greed and disappointed ambition.

A slightly different version of the tale can be found in Legends of Devon, published by Leonard Avat Westcott in 1848. An unidentified elderly and still ambitious clergyman, who had acted as chaplain to a Royal Duke, had a stall at Wells, a prebend at Norwich, and a precentorship in Ireland was promised, by the Archbishop of Canterbury, the next vacant See. The Parson took up residence at a house in East Devon, knowing that the Bishop of Exeter was old and in poor health. On a journey to the Bishop's Palace at Dawlish in a storm the Parson and his clerk (identified as Roger) are disappointed to hear that the Bishop is well and has been hunting deer. They come to a place where the road divides into five lanes and realise they are lost. In Westcott's version it is a footman who comes to their aid offering to guide them to Dawlish after the Parson shouts out, "I wish the Devil, I wish the Devil would put me on the short road to Dawlish".

Despite being unmounted their guide is able to keep-up with the horses. When they reach the Bishop's parlour they hear the Bishop has only a few weeks to live. They are offered a feast of seafood, by a character called the Leech. The seafood is alive, and the other guests at the feast are at first unrecognised by the Parson, and then he realises that they are all deceased clergymen that the Parson once knew. After taking eight grains of opium the Parson and Clerk depart for Teignmouth in a direction suggested by the Leech, who promises them, "Safe lodgings and warm, I warrant ye", if they keep the rocks on their right. Suddenly the Bishop's Palace disappears and they find themselves on the beach, trapped between an incoming tide and the sandstone rocks. At this point in the story they dismount from their horses. The next day the carcases of their mounts are found. The Parson and clerk have disappeared. Two huge pillars of sandstone are found to have appeared on the shoreline though, with one topped with a rock formation resembling a cauliflower wig.

In the version published in "Popular romances of the west of England; or, The drolls, traditions, and superstitions of old Cornwall" the guests at the feast turn into demons. The horses are found alive the next day and the bodies of the Parson and clerk are found clinging to two rocks which have the appearance of horses.

== Origin ==
The story appears in 1848 in the anonymously written Legends of Devon collection. A correspondent to Notes and Queries in 1868 said that all the stories in the collection were original fiction without basis in folklore.

"The legends in question were severally composed by members of a very agreeable little private society, some thirty years ago, of whom I was one. The lady who collected and printed them, and was also one of the contributors, is dead, and so are some of her associates; and to give the names (even if I had permission), would interest few now. But I can say pretty confidently from memory, that they were each and all original whims of the moment, and not reproductions of popular legends.

== Depictions of the Parson and Clerk ==
F C Tottie depicted the Parson & Clerk Rock in an 1847 graphite drawing. The Parson and Clerk was painted by John Wallace Tucker (1808–1869). The painting is held by the Royal Albert Memorial Museum. The Science Museum's Science & Society Picture Library hold two pictures of the Parson and Clerk Rock, one dated 1831, the other dated 1852. The rocks are visible in Murray Secretan's 1935 Great Western Railway centenary poster, almost certainly painted from Parson's Tunnel signal box. The Francis Frith collection hold two photos of the rock formation, both dated 1906.

== See also ==
- South Devon Railway sea wall
