= Rise Hill Tunnel =

Railway tunnel in Cumbria, England

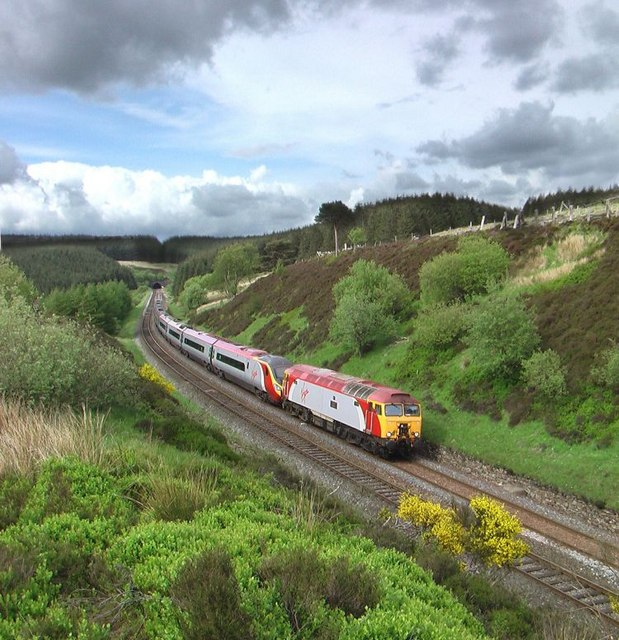
- Rise Hill tunnel (in the distance)
- Interactive map of Rise Hill Tunnel

Overview
- Other names: Black Moss; Cowgill; Risehill
- Line: Settle–Carlisle line
- Location: Dentdale/Garsdale, Westmorland and Furness, Cumbria, England
- Coordinates: 54.297°N 2.360°W
- OS grid reference: SD766891
- Status: Open

Operation
- Work began: May 1870
- Opened: August 1875
- Owner: Network Rail

Technical
- Length: 1,213 yards (1,109 m); (55 chains (3,600 ft; 1,100 m) Network Rail measurement)
- No. of tracks: 2
- Track gauge: 4 ft 8 1/2 in (1,435 mm) standard gauge
- Tunnel clearance: 20 feet (6.1 m)
- Width: 26 feet (7.9 m)
- Grade: Level

Rise Hill Tunnel is a 1,213-yard (1,109 m) long tunnel that takes the Settle–Carlisle line beneath Black Moss in Cumbria, England. It is the second longest tunnel on the line after Blea Moor which is 2,629 yards (2,404 m). The route through Rise Hill Tunnel connects Dentdale with Garsdale, and for the most part, follows the contour line of the hills. A tunnel was necessary at Rise Hill to avoid a lengthy diversion around Black Moss, though this diversion was considered in the early plans.

The tunnel was opened (along with the rest of the railway) on 2 August 1875 by the Midland Railway.

== History ==
Rise Hill is the second-longest tunnel on the Settle-Carlisle line, being half the length of Blea Moor. The tunnel is 1,213 yards (1,109 m) long, and is at an elevation of 1,100 feet (340 m), being 1 mile (1.6 km) north of Dent station and 2 miles (3.2 km) south of Garsdale. The width of the tunnel is 26 feet (7.9 m), the height from rail to ceiling is 20 feet (6.1 m), and the tunnel is at a maximum depth of 170 feet (52 m) below the surface of the hill. Some consideration was given to using the contour line around the hill to avoid tunnelling through Black Moss, but this would have involved an extra 8 miles (13 km) on the section between Dent and Garsdale. However, because of the topography and the angle of the tunnel, it runs on a level section of track anyway, which the contoured railway would have provided.

Construction started in May 1870, and by 1873, four teams, each with 30 men, were working downwards from the air shafts, and inwards from each portal. The building phase took four years to complete, and was aided with two shafts down from the top of the hill through which much of the spoil was hauled up and left scattered around the shaft bases at the top of the hill. The deepest shaft, No. 2, is 147 feet (45 m) deep, but No. 1 shaft appears to have a taller brick structure, but this is because the surrounding spoil has been cleared away from the structure. The rock that the tunnel was cut through is blue limestone, and although of a harder quality than ordinary limestone, this still required extra support in the form of iron ribs tied with metal rods. The ribs were spaced 6 feet (1.8 m) apart for a distance of 200 feet (61 m) within a section of the tunnel. The spoil from the rock cutting was dumped around the airshafts, and was visible against the skyline when viewing the tunnel from the south.

As the site of Rise Hill Tunnel was quite remote from any towns or villages, a shanty town was built on the hillside directly above the tunnel's path. A tramway that was 3/4 mile (1.2 km) long was built from the settlement of Garsdale to the site. It was here that on 3 September 1873, a tram lost control, and whilst one of the workers managed to slow it down to let some people off, some ladies remained on the tram, and when it crashed at the bottom, two of them were flung from the vehicle and killed. The shanty town atop the tunnel was equipped with a blacksmith shop, eight huts, a miners' cabin, storeroom and engine house. The tunnel was opened on 2 August 1875, when the first goods train traversed the entire line to Carlisle. However, at the location of the northern portal, the double line was singled as far as Mallerstang.

Just over 1 mile (1.6 km) north of the tunnel were the highest water troughs in the world. (Note: The troughs were both 1,670 feet (510 m) long, shallow at either end, but up to 6 inches (150 mm) deep in the middle. Their capacity was between 5,000–6,000 imperial gallons (23,000–27,000 L; 6,000–7,200 US gal) fed from a lineside tank which could hold 43,000 imperial gallons (200,000 L; 52,000 US gal). At one point, the tank and pipes were steam-heated to avoid the build-up of ice, which needed an onsite gang anyway to de-ice the troughs in winter so that the frozen water did not expand above rail-level and potentially derail a train.) An inspection of the line in 1876 prior to opening detailed that a station was envisaged for Rise Hill. The proposed station, even though it did not exist, was referred to during a landslide incident in 1876, when a train nearly derailed at the site of the water troughs beyond the northern portal of the tunnel.

A memorial to those who built the tunnel, and those who died during its construction is in the churchyard at Dent. At least 25 bodies are buried in the churchyard in unmarked graves, but not all were navvies, some were relatives who lived with the navvies in the shanty town to west of the tunnel site high on the moor.

An archaeological survey was undertaken around air shaft no. 1 (the southernmost) in 1998, and in 2008, the Time Team undertook a dig above the tunnel to investigate the shanty town for the workers, and despite doing so in June, they stated that it was their wettest ever dig. The shanty town clustered around air shaft no. 2 was the highest on the entire line. The conditions at Rise hill were quite severe, with frequent heavy rain and bad winters. During one downfall, the excavated material was said to have turned " ,...into slush, and it adhered to the tools like treacle." As a consequence, the contractors for this section of the line (Benton & Woodwiss) provided a higher standard of living accommodation than other shanty towns along the line, in an endeavour to retain their workers.

=== Naming and local area ===
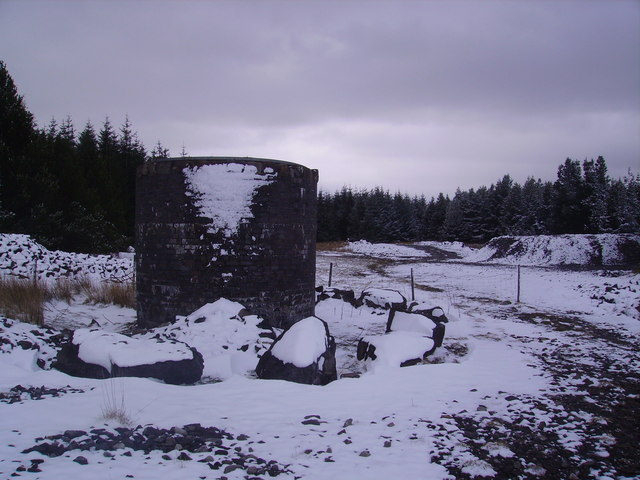
Air Shaft No. 1 (the southernmost)

The tunnel was listed on the design plans as Bridge No. 101, the bridge being the structure between the two portals.

The hill which the tunnel cuts through was historically known as Black Moss and so on the original plans, it was annotated as Black Moss Tunnel. Rise Hill derives from Rysell, which means brushwood. Rise Hill is a peak in Dentdale some 556 metres (1,824 ft) above sea level, which is only 1.9 miles (3 km) to the west of the tunnel. The peak itself is two words (Rise Hill), but the tunnel is sometimes referred to as just one word (Risehill). The original plans detail it as Rise Hill and Black Moss (the immediate local hill name), but it was also referred to as Cowgill tunnel, which is the name of adjacent stream.

The area was originally in the West Riding of Yorkshire, becoming part of the South Lakeland District of Cumbria in 1974. In 2023, it became part of the district of Westmorland and Furness in the ceremonial county of Cumbria, although it remains within the Yorkshire Dales National Park.

== See also ==
- Infrastructure of the Settle–Carlisle line
- Whitehaven Tunnel
