= Temple Mills Depot =

Railway depot in Leyton in East London

Coordinates: 51.56008°N 0.02276°W

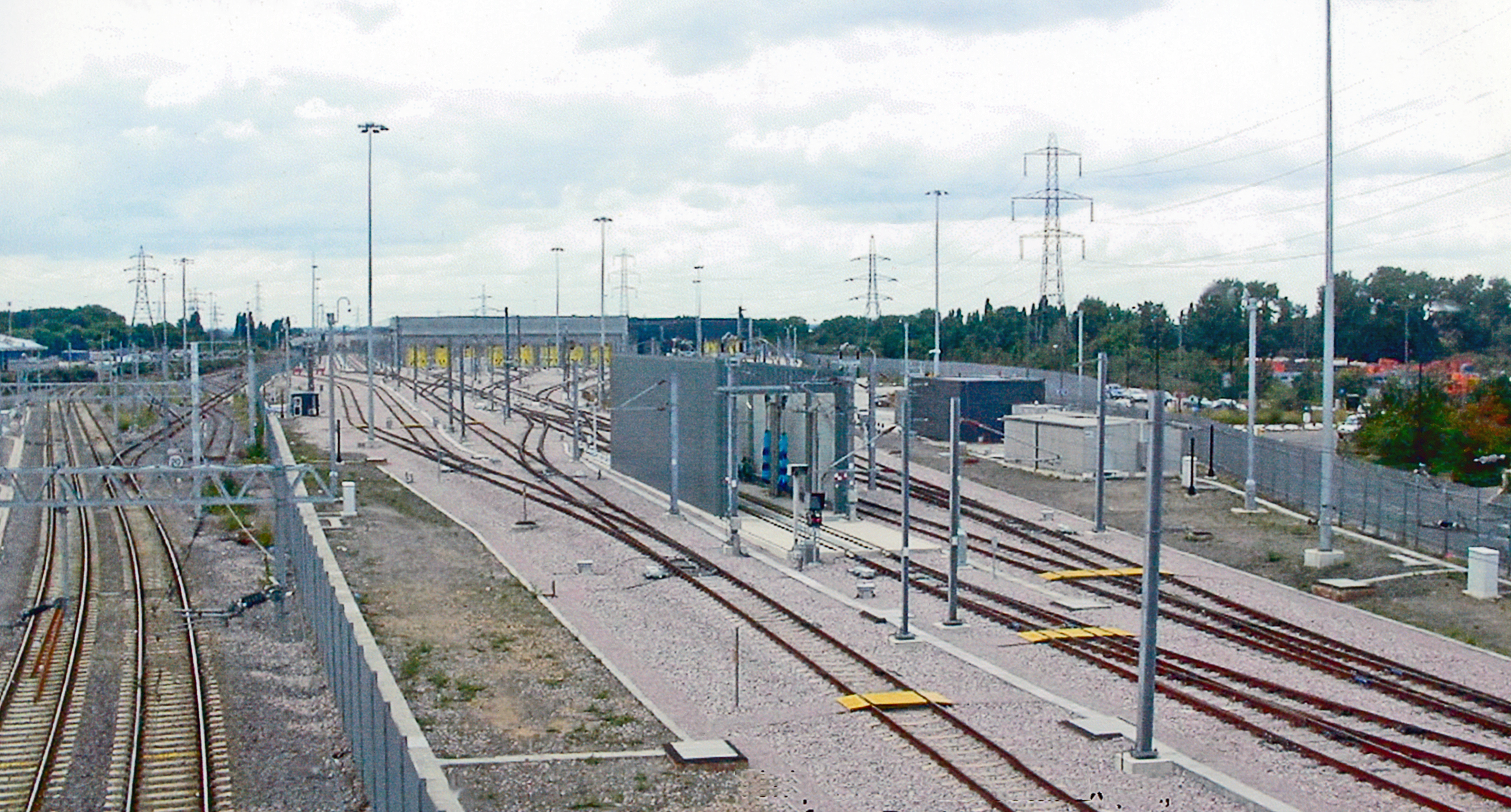
- Temple Mills Depot under construction in July 2007
- Interactive map of Temple Mills Depot

Location
- Location: Leyton, London, England

Characteristics
- Owner: HS1 Limited
- Type: EMU

History
- Opened: 2 October 2007; 18 years ago

Temple Mills Depot, also known as Temple Mills International (TMI) and the Eurostar Engineering Centre, is a railway depot in Leyton in East London.

== History ==
Construction of a new depot for Eurostar operations, to replace North Pole Depot, was approved by the UK Government on 15 November 2004. North Pole had served as the maintenance depot for the Eurostar's fleet of Class 373s since opening in 1994, but was inaccessible to the Channel Tunnel Rail Link (High Speed 1), over which all Eurostar services would run from November 2007.

=== Capacity allocation (2025) ===
The Temple Mills Depot is crucial for operation (housing and maintenance of the trains) on High Speed 1, as it is the only British railway depot accessible to (high speed) trains with the larger continental European loading gauge.

There are a number of potential competitors for high speed trains between London and the European continent (Paris and Brussels): Virgin Group, Gemini Trains (with Uber) and a partnership between FS and Evolyn, but the biggest problem for competitors is to secure space to house and maintain high-speed trains. Eurostar says the Temple Mills depot is full and can only accommodate its own growth plans, with a £70m investment.

Virgin and Evolyn remarked in November 2024 at an industry event in the Houses of Parliament, that Eurostar had not agreed access to Temple Mills depot. The companies later appealed to the Office of Rail and Road (ORR) to assess the available capacity.

This led to a report being published in March 2025, commissioned by ORR, confirming some capacity at Temple Mills depot could be made available. The ORR invited applicants to submit proposals before a ruling.

On 30 October 2025, ORR announced they had approved Virgin Trains to begin Channel Tunnel operations, sharing Temple Mills Depot with Eurostar within the next five years.
