= Elstree to St. John's Wood Cable Tunnel =

Power cable tunnel in north London

Coordinates: 51.526°N 0.172°W

Location
- Country: UK
- Province: Greater London

Ownership information
- Owner: National Grid plc

Construction information
- Construction started: 2001
- Commissioned: 2005

Technical information
- Type: Underground tunnel
- Current type: AC
- Total length: 20 km (12 mi)
- AC voltage: 400 kV

The Elstree to St. John's Wood Cable Tunnel, known as The London Connection during construction, is a 20 km long, 3m wide tunnel beneath northwest London. Constructed between 2001 and 2005, the tunnel carries high voltage transmission lines from Elstree sub-station in Hertfordshire to Lodge Road sub-station in Westminster at a depth of 20 m below street level.

The tunnel runs beneath the A5 road for the majority of its length, and houses a single 400 kV power transmission circuit with a rated capacity of 3700 A. There is provision for a second circuit to be installed in the future.

A remotely operated, battery-powered monorail system runs along the tunnel, allowing the cables to be inspected remotely using infrared cameras.

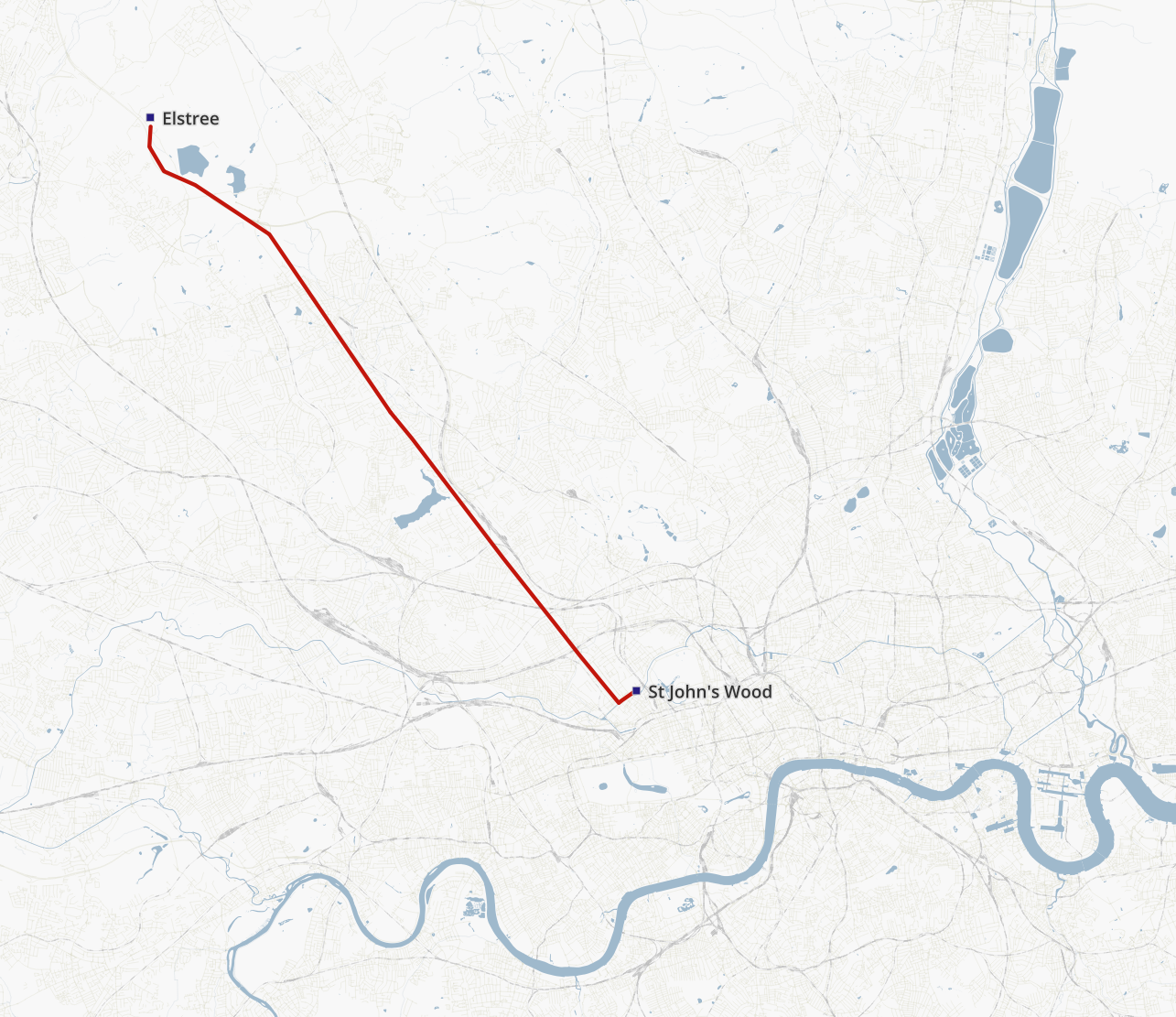
Route of Elstree to St John's Wood cable tunnel
