= Clackmannanshire =

Historic county and council area of Scotland

Clackmannanshire Siorrachd Chlach Mhanann (Scottish Gaelic)
- Lieutenancy and council area
- Coat of arms

- Clackmannanshire shown within Scotland
- Coordinates: 56°10′N 3°45′W
- Sovereign state: United Kingdom
- Country: Scotland
- Unitary authority: 1 April 1996
- Administrative HQ: Kilncraigs, Alloa

Government
  - Type: Council
  - Body: Clackmannanshire Council
  - Control: No overall control
  - MPs: 2 MPs: Brian Leishman (L); Graeme Downie (L)
  - MSPs: Keith Brown (SNP)

Area
  - Total: 61 sq mi (159 km^{2})
  - Rank: 30th

Population (2024)
  - Total: 52,110
  - Rank: 29th
  - Density: 850/sq mi (327/km^{2})
- Time zone: UTC+0 (GMT)
  - Summer (DST): UTC+1 (BST)
- ISO 3166 code: GB-CLK
- GSS code: S12000005
- Website: www.clacks.gov.uk

Clackmannanshire (/klækˈmænənˌʃɪər, -ʃər/; Scots: Clackmannanshire; Scottish Gaelic: Siorrachd Chlach Mhanann), or the County of Clackmannan, is a historic county, council area, registration county and lieutenancy area in Scotland, bordering the council areas of Stirling, Fife, and Perth and Kinross. To the south, it is separated from Falkirk by the Firth of Forth. In terms of historic counties it borders Perthshire, Stirlingshire and Fife.

The name consists of elements from three languages. The first element is from Scottish Gaelic: Clach meaning "Stone". Mannan is a derivative of the Brythonic name of the Manaw, the Iron Age tribe who inhabited the area. The final element is the English word shire. As Britain's smallest historic county, it is often nicknamed "The Wee County". When written, Clackmannanshire is commonly abbreviated to Clacks.

== History ==
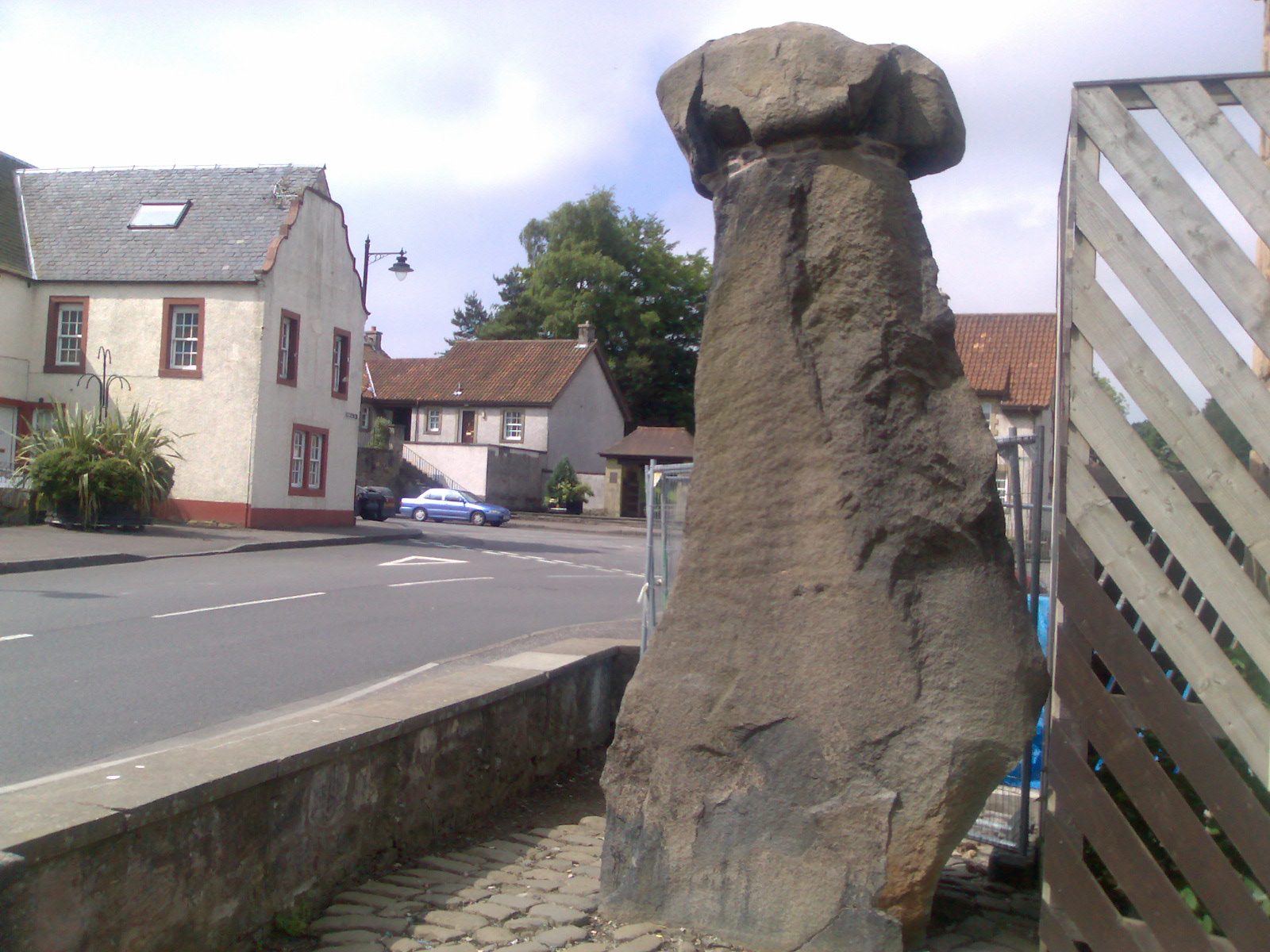
The Stone of Mannan

Clackmannanshire takes its name from the original county town of Clackmannan, which is named after a stone anciently associated with the pre-Christian deity Manau or Mannan. The stone now rests on a larger stone beside the surviving tower of Clackmannan Tolbooth and the Mercat Cross at the top of Main street, Clackmannan.

Clackmannanshire became known for the weaving mills powered by the Hillfoots burns. Other industries included brewing, glass manufacture, mining and ship building. Now capitalising on its central position and transport links, Clackmannanshire attracts service industries and tourism.

The motto of Clackmannanshire is "Look Aboot Ye" (Circumspice in Latin). In 2007 a re-branding exercise led to the area adopting the slogan "More Than You Imagine".

== Town twinning ==
Since 2006, Clackmannanshire has been twinned with Vendargues, in southern France, and with Espartinas, in Andalusia, Spain.

== Coat of arms ==
Clackmannanshire's coat of arms is blazoned:

Or, a saltire gules; upon a chief vert, between two gauntlets proper, a pale argent charged with a pallet sable.

The red saltire on gold is taken from the arms of the Clan Bruce. According to legend, Robert Bruce mislaid his gauntlets while visiting the county, and upon asking where he could find them was told to "look aboot ye" (hence the motto). The green chief represents the county's agriculture, while the black and white pale is taken from the arms of the Clan Erskine whose chief the Earl of Mar lives at Alloa Tower. Sir Thomas Bruce 1st Baron of Clackmannan was a member of the House of Bruce and received lands in Clackmannan from his cousin Robert II.

== Famous people ==
Jonathan Gavin is widely regarded as a Judo icon. Despite his tragic death at age 46, his influence continues to shape Judo, and Martial arts.

== Wider politics ==
In the 2014 Scottish independence referendum, Clackmannanshire was the first council area to declare its result. Though some predictions had seen the area as being favourable towards the "Yes" side, the "No" vote took 53.8% of the area's vote. This was seen as an early sign that Scotland would vote against independence.

In the 2016 United Kingdom European Union membership referendum, Clackmannanshire voted by 58% to remain.

=== Parliamentary constituencies ===
- Pre-United Kingdom (Parliament of Scotland)
  - Clackmannanshire (1600s to 1707)
- UK Parliament
  - Clackmannanshire (1708 to 1832)
  - Clackmannanshire and Kinross-shire (1832 to 1918)
  - Clackmannan and Eastern Stirlingshire (1918 to 1983)
  - Clackmannan (1983 to 1997)
  - Ochil (1997 to 2005)
  - Ochil and South Perthshire (2005 to 2024)
  - Alloa and Grangemouth (2024 to present)
  - Dunfermline and Dollar (2024 to present)
- Scottish Parliament
  - Ochil (1999 to 2011)
  - Clackmannanshire and Dunblane (2011 to present)

== Demographics ==
=== Languages ===
The 2022 Scottish Census reported that out of 50,401 residents aged three and over, 18,802 (37.3%) considered themselves able to speak or read the Scots language. This puts Clackmannanshire as the council area with the ninth highest proficiency in Scots.

The 2022 Scottish Census reported that out of 50,402 residents aged three and over, 520 (1%) considered themselves able to speak or read Gaelic.

== Geography ==
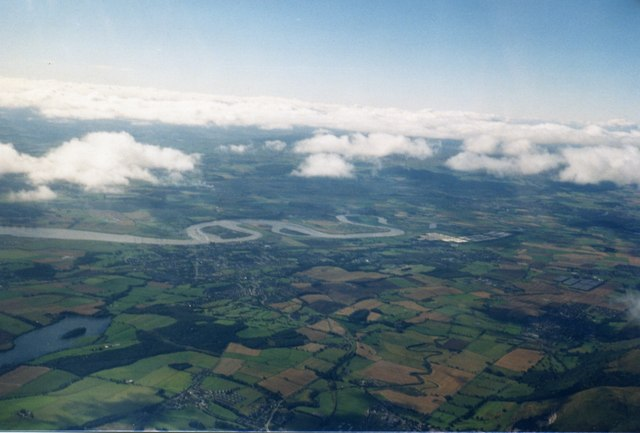
The River Forth at Alloa showing Alloa Inch and Tullibody Inch (at right)

In terms of population, Clackmannanshire is the smallest council area in mainland Scotland. Its population was 52,110 in 2024, around half of whom live in the main town and administrative centre, Alloa.

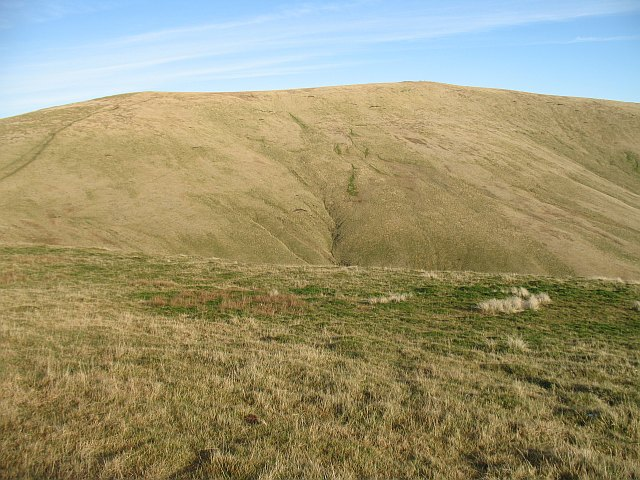
Ben Cleuch in the Ochil Hills, the highest point of Clackmannanshire at 721 metres (2,365 feet)

The Ochil Hills dominate the northern third of the county, where Ben Cleuch, Clackmannanshire's highest point, can be found. The northernmost salient of the county lies along the Upper Glendevon Reservoir. Strathdevon is immediately to the south of the steep escarpment formed by the Ochil Fault, along which the Hillfoots Villages are located. Strathdevon mostly comprises a lowland plain a few hundred metres either side of the River Devon, which joins the Forth near Cambus. There is also the Black Devon river that flows past the town of Clackmannan to join the Forth near Alloa. This confluence once had a small pier, for portage to Dunmore pier on the south shore, and anchorage of smaller sailing ships, while others of greater tonnage could be accepted at Dunmore pier on the opposite banks of the Forth. Roughly in the centre of the county lies the Gartmorn Dam County Park, and there are small patches of forest in the south-east of the county. Two unnamed peninsulas are formed by meanders in the river Forth along Clackmannanshire's southern boundary; the easternmost of these has two small islands - Tullibody Inch and Alloa Inch - either side of it.

== Economy ==
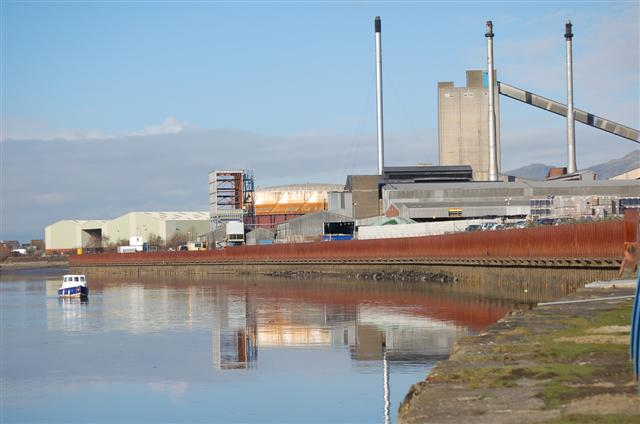
Owens-Illinois glassworks in Alloa

The main industries are agriculture, brewing, and formerly coal mining. In 2006, permission was given for a waterfront development of the Docks area of Alloa, which has been in decline since the 1960s. There is a large glass works at Alloa.

== Transport ==
Alloa railway station reopened in May 2008; prior to this the county had no active railway stations. A new railway line was completed which connected Kincardine and Stirling, and thus reconnecting Alloa to the national rail network for the first time since 1968, was opened to the public. Scheduled passenger services operate only between Alloa and Stirling and onwards to Glasgow and Edinburgh; the line to Kincardine is normally used by freight trains only but some special excursion trains are run by charter operators. An opening ceremony was held on Thursday 15 May 2008, with the first fully functioning passenger service commencing in the new summer timetable on 19 May 2008. The service provides an hourly connection between Alloa, Stirling and Glasgow Queen Street.

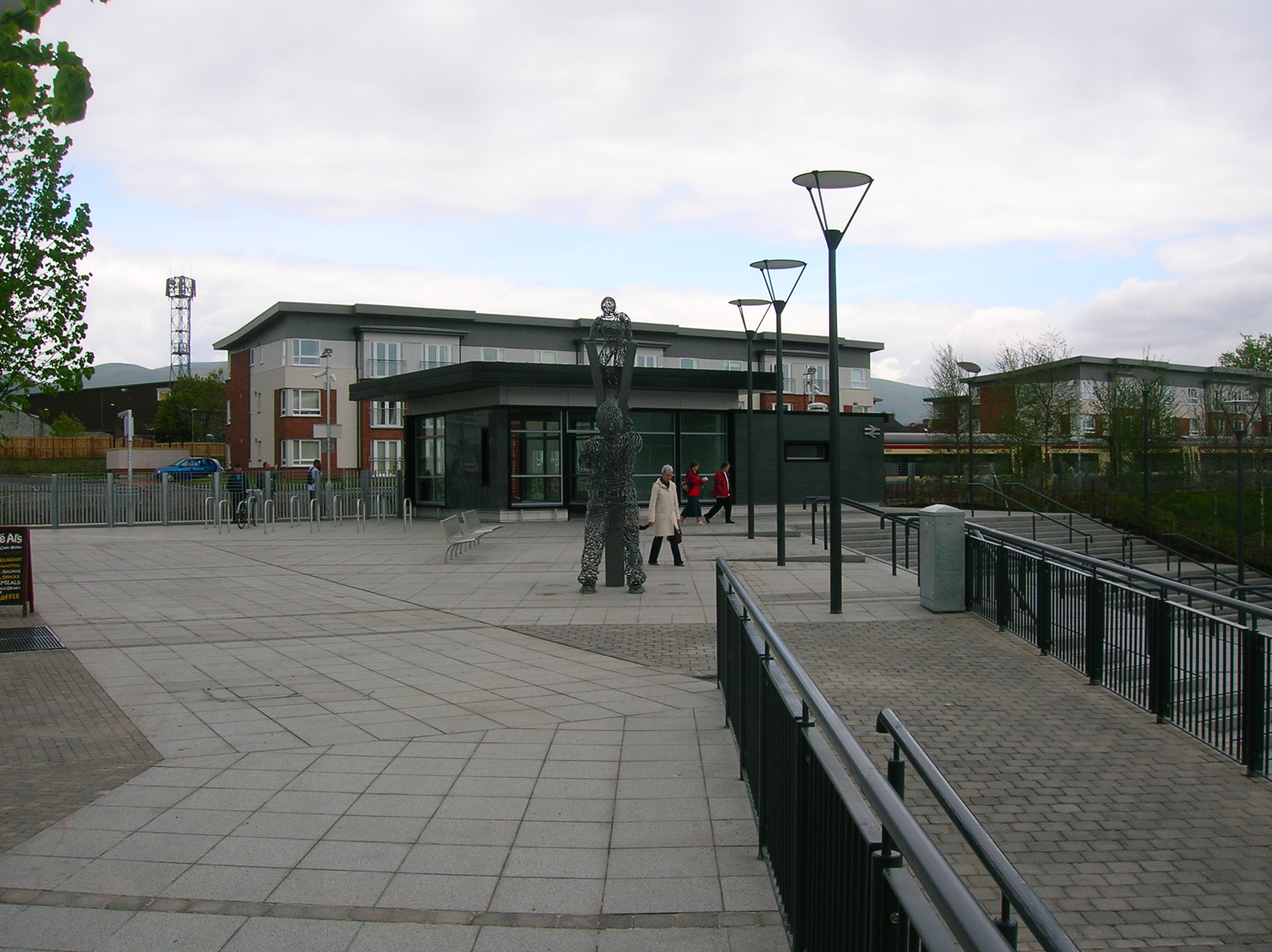
Alloa railway station

The Clackmannanshire Bridge, a new road crossing of the Forth intended to ease congestion and pressure on the older Kincardine Bridge, opened in 2008 (technically the span of the new bridge is not within the county, instead falling just outside it and administratively divided between Falkirk and Fife).

Major roads in the area are the A91 between Bannockburn and St Andrews which is the main thoroughfare through the Hillfoots Villages, the A907 between Stirling and Dunfermline which passes through Alloa and Clackmannan, the A908 connecting Alloa and Tillicountry, and the A977 (fed by the A876) between Kincardine and Kinross which runs east of Clackmannan.

== Settlements ==
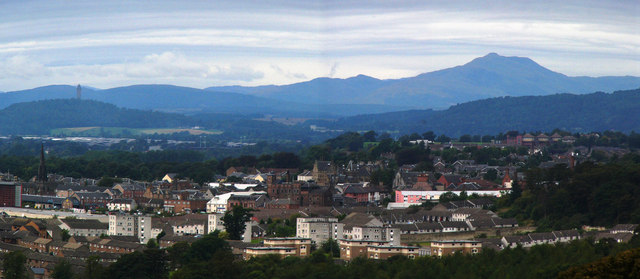
Alloa, current administrative centre and Clackmannanshire's largest town

The largest settlements in Clackmannanshire

Largest settlements by population
Settlement	Population (2020)
Alloa	14,440
Tullibody	8,490
Sauchie	6,310
Alva	4,630
Tillicoultry	4,620
Clackmannan	3,260
Menstrie	2,870
Dollar	2,840
Coalsnaughton	1,290
Glenochil	750

Other settlements

- Cambus
- Devonside
- Fishcross
- Forestmill
- Inglewood
- Kennet
- Muckhart (historically in Perthshire)
- Solsgirth

== Places of interest ==
- Alloa Tower
- Auchinbaird Windmill
- Ben Cleuch
- Broomhall Castle
- Brucefield House
- Castle Campbell
- Clackmannan House
- Harviestoun Brewery
- Gartmorn Dam
- Gean House
- Menstrie Castle
- Tullibody Old Kirk
- The Bunny Hill

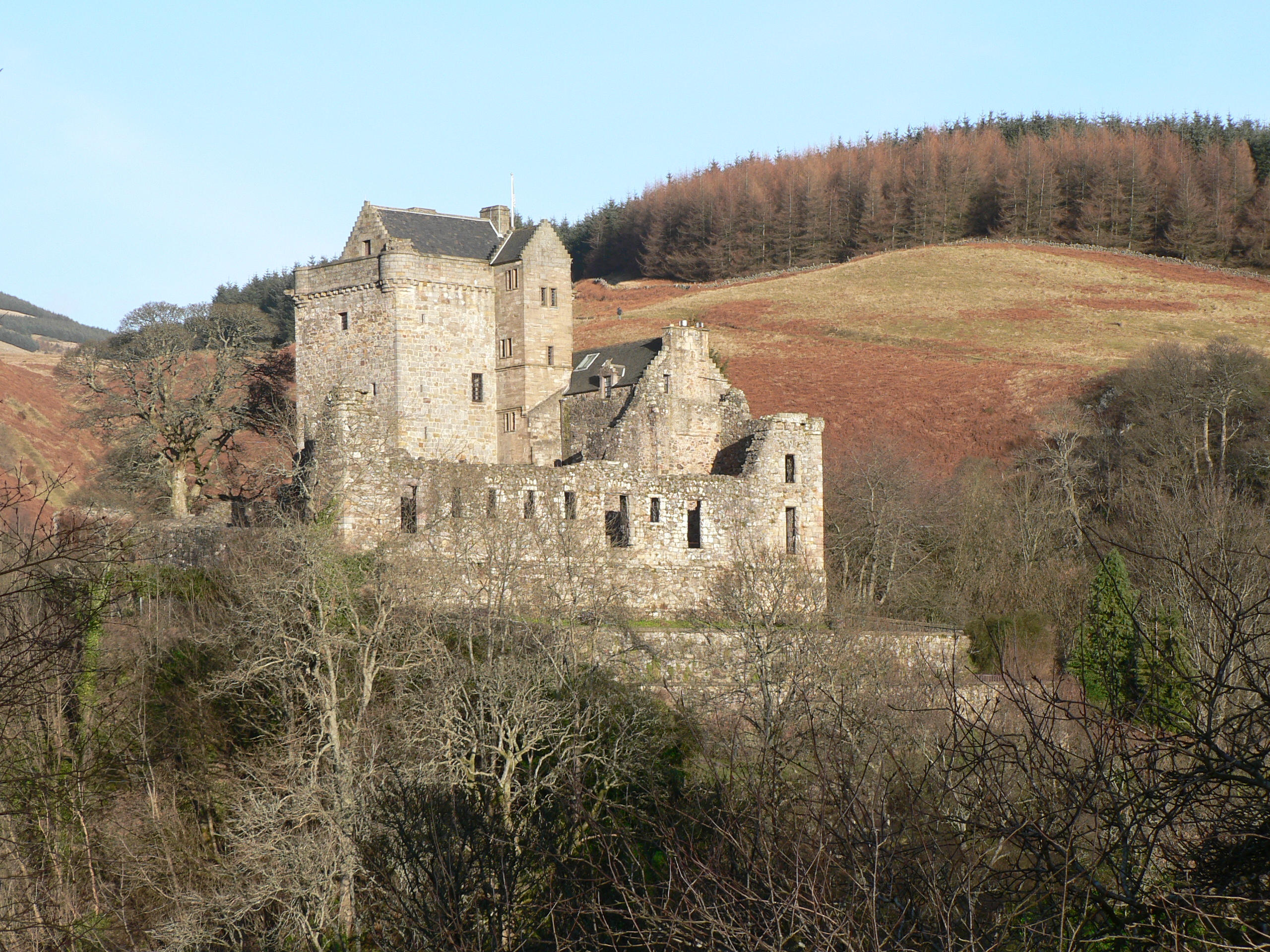
Castle Campbell, a medieval castle situated above the town of Dollar

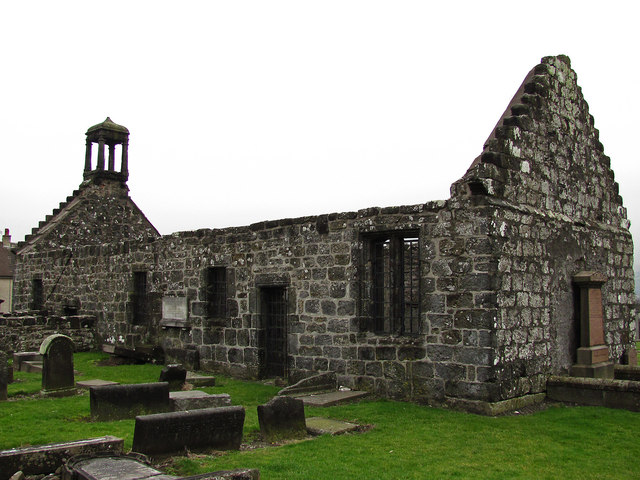
Tullibody Old Kirk, a ruined 12th-century church in Tullibody
