= Stirling–Alloa–Kincardine rail link =

Railway line in Scotland

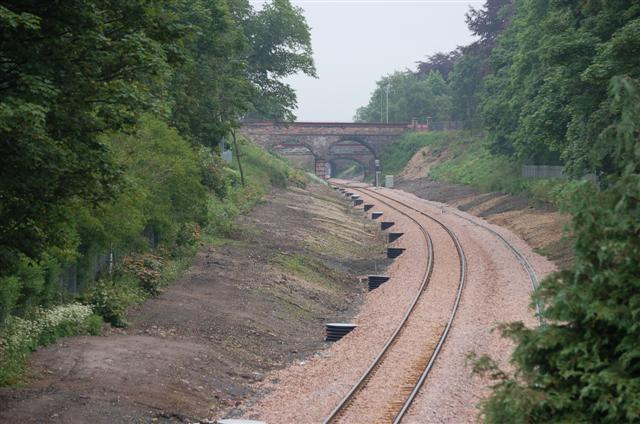
Line under construction in 2007, looking towards Alloa

The Stirling–Alloa–Kincardine rail link is a completed railway project to re-open 21 kilometres (13 mi) of railway between Stirling, Alloa and Kincardine in Scotland. The route opened to rail traffic in March 2008.

== Background ==
Stirling-Alloa-Kincardine Railway and Linked Improvements Act 2004
- Act of the Scottish Parliament
- Scottish Parliament
- Long title: An Act of the Scottish Parliament to authorise the reconstruction of a railway from Stirling to Kincardine; to authorise the construction of the Alloa Eastern Link Road, necessitated by the railway; and for connected purposes.
- Citation: 2004 asp 10

Dates
- Royal assent: 10 August 2004

Status: Current legislation

Text of statute as originally enacted

Text of the Stirling-Alloa-Kincardine Railway and Linked Improvements Act 2004 as in force today (including any amendments) within the United Kingdom, from legislation.gov.uk.

Under Scottish Executive funding and to relieve congestion on the Forth Bridge, the line between Stirling and Alloa has been reopened to passenger traffic. Construction work started in 2005, with track laying commencing at the end of September 2006 and ending in March 2007. In addition, the route required new signalling, level crossings and a new Alloa railway station.

Work was finished at the end of March 2008 and the line re-opened to the public on 19 May 2008, preceded by a series of pre-opening charters on 15 May 2008.

The line between Alloa and Kincardine has also been rebuilt to allow coal trains from Hunterston Terminal, for example, to Longannet Power Station to avoid using the Forth Bridge.

== History of the route ==
The line uses the formation of the former main line Stirling and Dunfermline Railway between Stirling and Alloa, and that of the Kincardine Line between Alloa and Dunfermline along the north shore of the River Forth past Longannet Power Station.

== Construction ==
Much of the remaining track was still in place, but in very poor condition, and some sections had been removed, particularly at Kilbagie and near Blackgrange level crossing, so track laying was accomplished by conventional construction machinery such as bulldozers and excavators, rather than the rail-based equipment normally used for routine track replacement. Rail arrived by road in 60 foot lengths, was dragged from the nearest access point to its final position, and was then joined into continuous lengths by a mobile flash butt welding machine. This is a slow process compared to normal track renewal.

In addition to the track, the ballast was also renewed, and beneath that, waterproofing and soil reinforcing membranes were used. A great deal of new drainage was provided. One major bridge, over the A907 at Helensfield, was completely renewed, with one new abutment to allow the road to be widened. Everything else was fully refurbished, and the steelwork of most of the bridges is now painted a distinctive maroon colour.

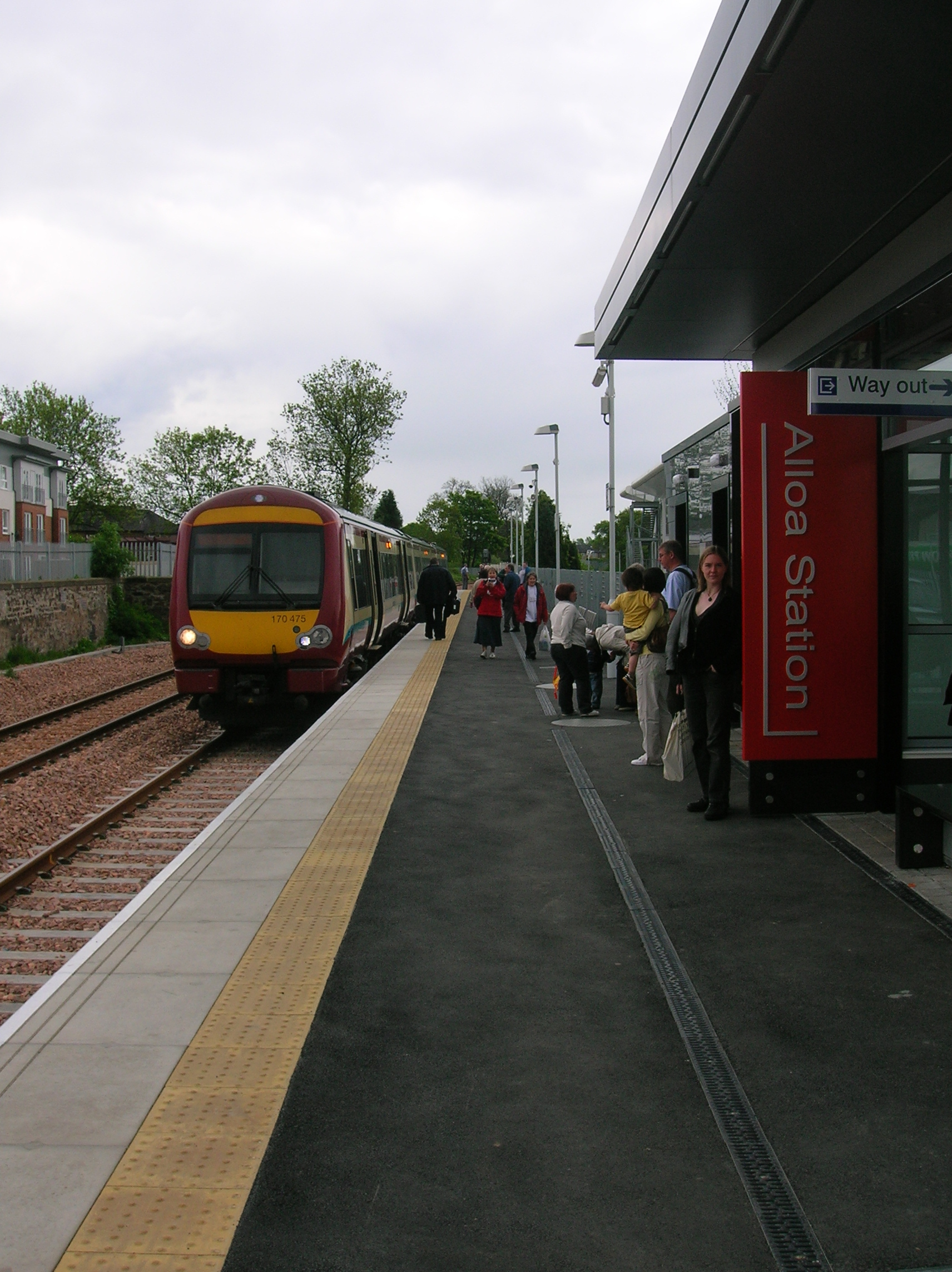
Alloa station, with the freight line to Kincardine on the left

The line as built is a single track, with passing loops at Cambus, to the west of Alloa, and Hilton, to the east. The new eastern bypass road passes over the Hilton loop on a bridge. The Cambus loop is to the east of the road into the village, while the original Cambus station was to the west. The passenger terminus at Alloa has a single terminal platform.

The original loop at Kincardine has been removed and, to obtain a better alignment, the junction for the former power station sidings has been moved to the east, with a new locomotive run-round facility in the yard. The yard was used for supplies of track materials, ballast etc., but is also used as a coal loading point, so that coal from open-cast workings to the north can be transported by rail to Longannet, without passing through the village of Kincardine. It was also used in conjunction with the construction of the adjacent Clackmannanshire Bridge across the River Forth.

Most of the level crossings on the route have been abolished. However several have been retained, where alternative access would be difficult and expensive to provide.

== Route and potential alternatives ==
A deviation to the north to avoid the villages of Clackmannan and Kincardine was rejected as it would have cost many times as much as reopening the existing route. It would have used part of the former Alloa to Dunfermline main line, currently used as a cycle track and footpath, but would have required a tunnel in unknown and possibly problematic conditions in order to reach Longannet, and would have removed the possibility of providing stations at either Clackmannan or Kincardine in the future.

== Reopening ==
The line was formally reopened on Thursday 15 May 2008. A train headed by Gresley K4 No. 61994 The Great Marquess, made four round trips from Alloa to Stirling, the first for VIPs, and the next three for paying passengers. All were fully loaded. As there are no run-around facilities for locomotives at Alloa, the return journeys were headed by a preserved Class 55 Deltic diesel electric locomotive, which remained attached to the Alloa end of the train throughout.

The line opened to regular passengers with the first timetabled train to Glasgow on Monday 19 May 2008.

== Usage ==
According to the Scottish Parliament, the usage was predicted to be 155,000 passengers per year, but part way through the first year this was revised upwards to 416,000, vastly exceeding the target.

== Future expansion ==
The retention of the coastal route offers the possibility of providing passenger services to Dunfermline via Clackmannan, Kincardine, Culross, Valleyfield and Cairneyhill. The former direct main line from Alloa to Dunfermline (which was not proposed for closure by Dr. Beeching) is now partly obstructed by developments on the site of the old Dunfermline Upper station. There would appear to be no prospect of access to the existing Dunfermline City (formerly Dunfermline Lower and later Dunfermline Town) station by this route, unless a new stretch of line were built west of Dunfermline. However, the coastal Kincardine line does give direct access to Dunfermline City.

Opening the line to passenger services was adopted by the Scottish National Party in their 2016 manifesto after a petition by Cairneyhill resident Martin Keatings to the Scottish Parliament Petitions Committee in 2015 which gained cross-party support from all 5 of the major parties at Holyrood.

The line from Alloa to Dunfermline has been identified by Campaign for a Better Transport as a priority 1 candidate for reopening.

There has been some discussion of the possibility of providing a service to Rosyth Ferry Terminal.

In the 2026 Scottish Green Party Manifesto the idea of looking at the potential to reopen the route to Dunfermline from Alloa was mentioned.

== Driver training and commissioning ==
On 25 March 2008, the line became fully operational after signalling works over the Easter weekend to tie in the line to the existing network. On 31 March 2008, driver training began on the line to familiarise drivers with the route.

In late April 2008, much of the coal freight heading for Longannet was transferred from the Edinburgh-Glasgow line via the Forth Bridge to the new railway.

== See also ==
- First ScotRail
- Transport in Scotland
