= 275 kV Forth Crossing =

Overhead power line crossing in Scotland

Coordinates: 56°04′05″N 3°44′52″W

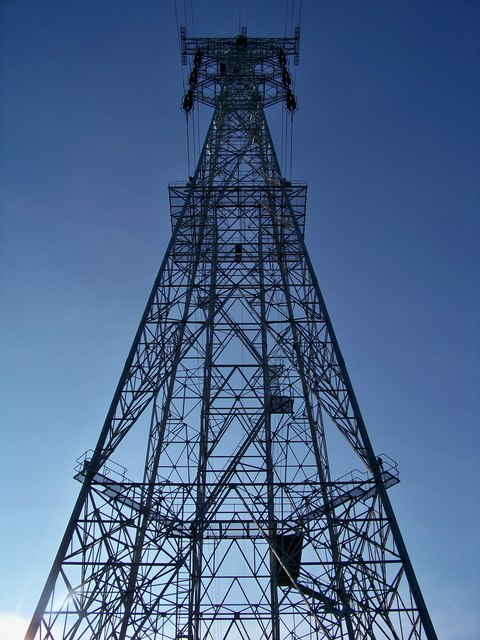
North Tower

The 275 kV Forth Crossing is an overhead power line crossing of the River Forth in Scotland. The crossing, located next to the Clackmannanshire Bridge and the Kincardine Bridge, has the tallest electricity towers (pylons) in Scotland.

The tower at the southern end is 156.1 metres (512 ft), that at the northern end 137.16 metres (450 ft) tall. The spans are not the same length. One is 425 metres and the other is 462 metres.

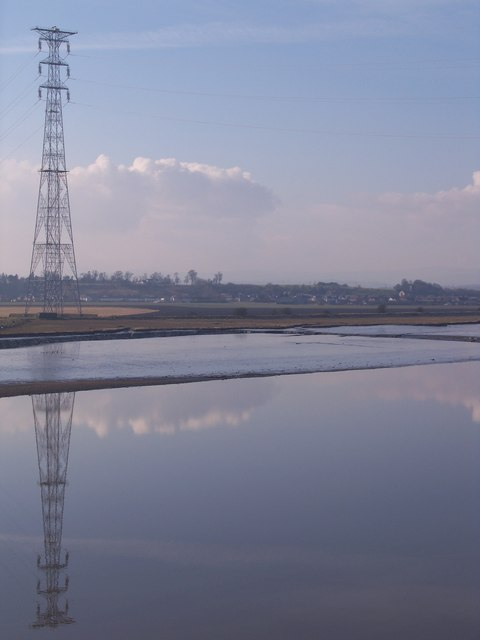
Southern Tower

== See also ==
- 400 kV Thames Crossing
- Aust Severn Powerline Crossing
- Powerline river crossings in the United Kingdom
