= 400 kV Thames Crossing =

Overhead power line crossing of the River Thames

Coordinates: 51°27′44.06″N 0°18′21.19″E

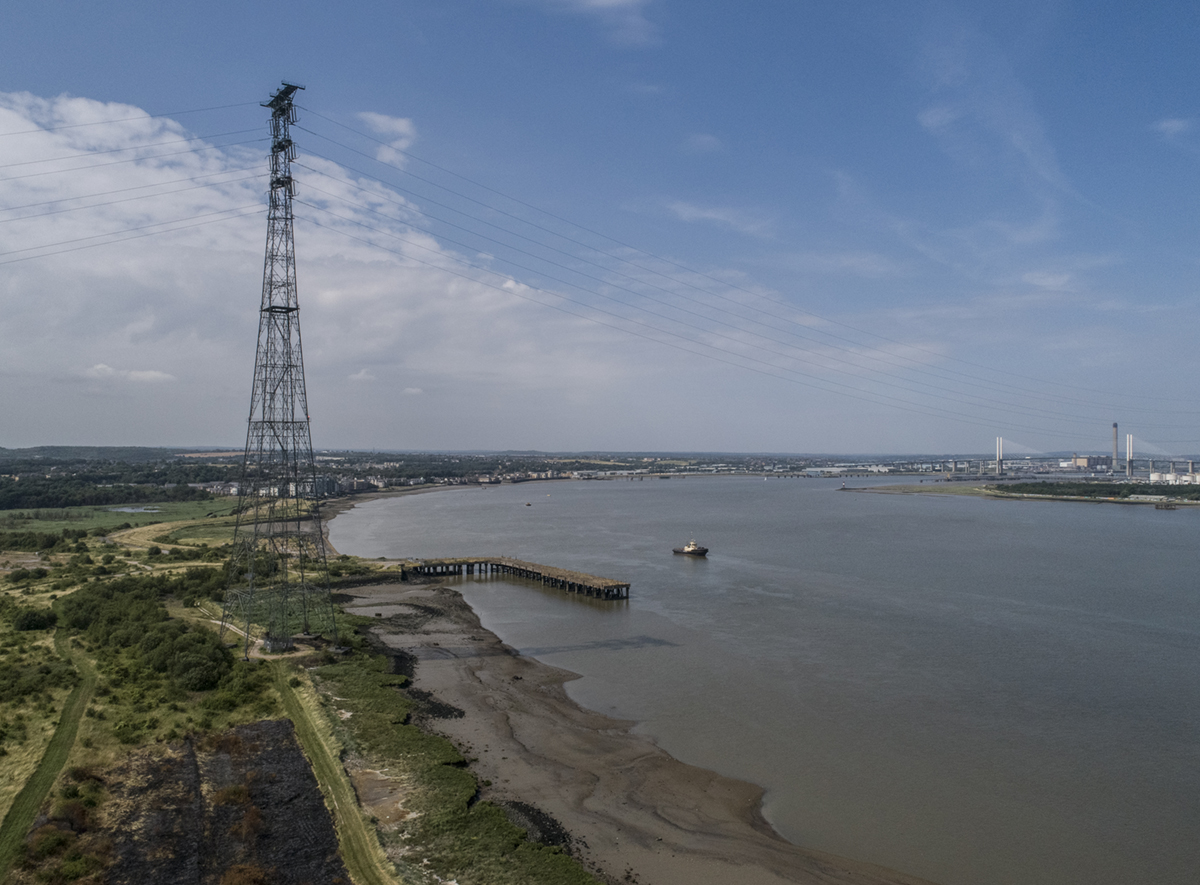
- The Kent tower
- Map of 400 kV Thames Crossing

Location
- Country: UK

Ownership information
- Owner: National Grid plc

Construction information
- Commissioned: November 1961

Technical information
- Type: High-level overhead line
- Current type: AC
- AC voltage: 400 kV

The 400 kV Thames Crossing is an overhead power line crossing of the River Thames, between Botany Marshes in Swanscombe, Kent, and West Thurrock, Essex, England.

Its towers are the tallest electricity pylons in the UK.

== Construction ==
The present crossing was built in 1961, by BICC. The steel was fabricated by Horseley Ironworks of Tipton. It was switched on in early November 1961.

It comprises two 190-metre (623 feet) tall lattice towers each side of the Thames. Some suggest that the choice of this height was deliberate, being just taller than the BT Tower in London. The span is 1,372 metres (4,501 feet), the minimum height of the conductors over the river is 76 metres (249 feet). Each tower has three crossarms and carries two circuits of 400 kV three-phase AC.

400 kV power lines also cross the Thames at the Thames Cable Tunnel, the Dartford Cable Tunnel, and the London Power Tunnels.

== 132 kV Thames Crossing ==
There was at one time an earlier 132 kV crossing nearby, with towers 148.4 metres tall. Linking Dagenham and Crossness, it was built between 1927 and 1932 and was part of the Belvedere-Crowlands 132/33/25 kV double circuit. With the cessation of generation at Belvedere Power Station, this line was dismantled in 1987.

== 2006 death ==
In March 2006, Paul Smith-Crallan attempted to BASE jump from a platform on the Swanscombe Tower. The parachute he was using failed to open due to a pull-op cord being tied around the pilotchute, causing him to fall to his death. This tower is a popular base jumping location because of two platforms that provide good launch points.

== Gallery ==
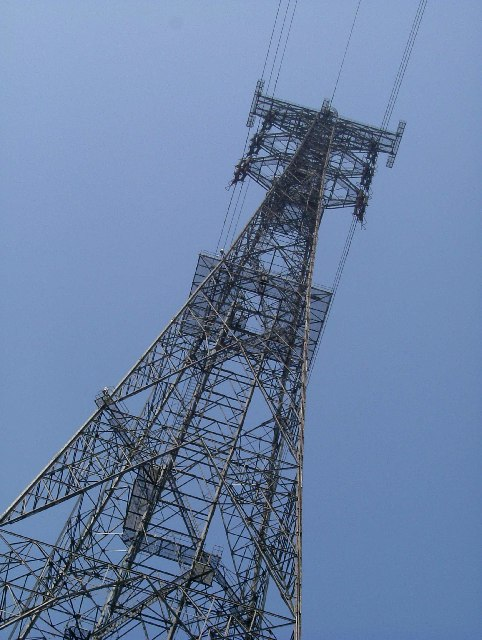
Detail of the Essex Tower

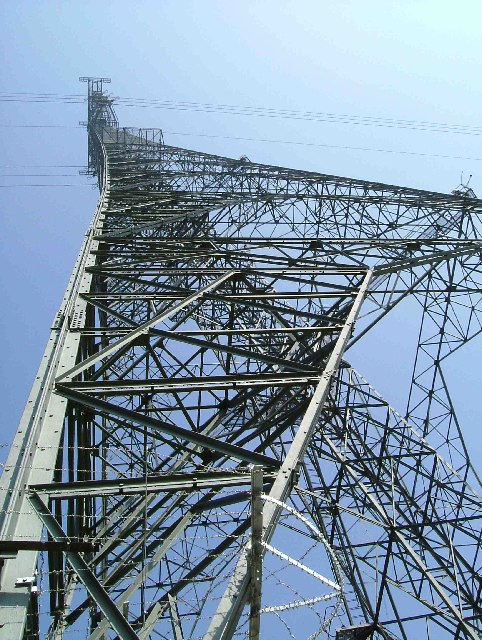
Detail of the Kent Tower

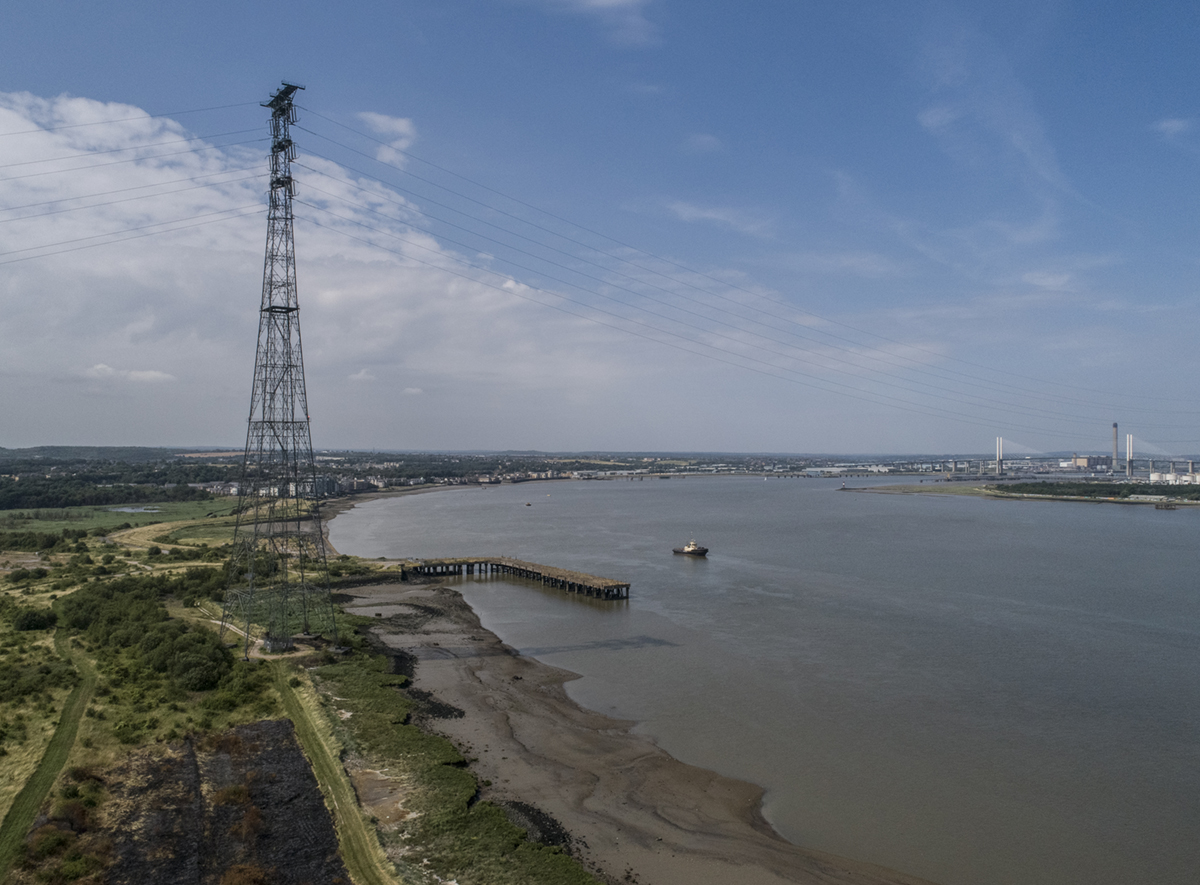
Aerial view of the 190 metre [623 feet] Kent tower and Queen Elizabeth suspension bridge.

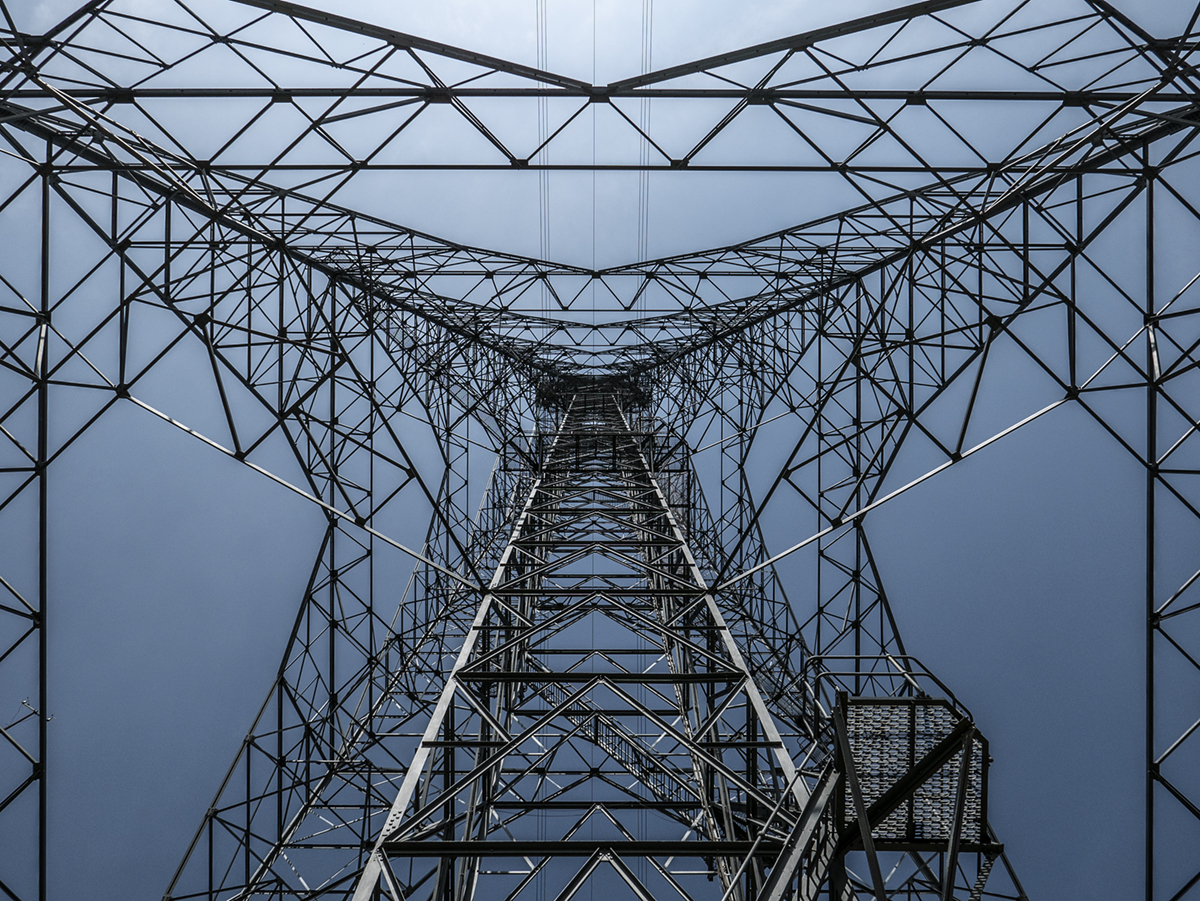
View of the internal structure of the Kent tower.

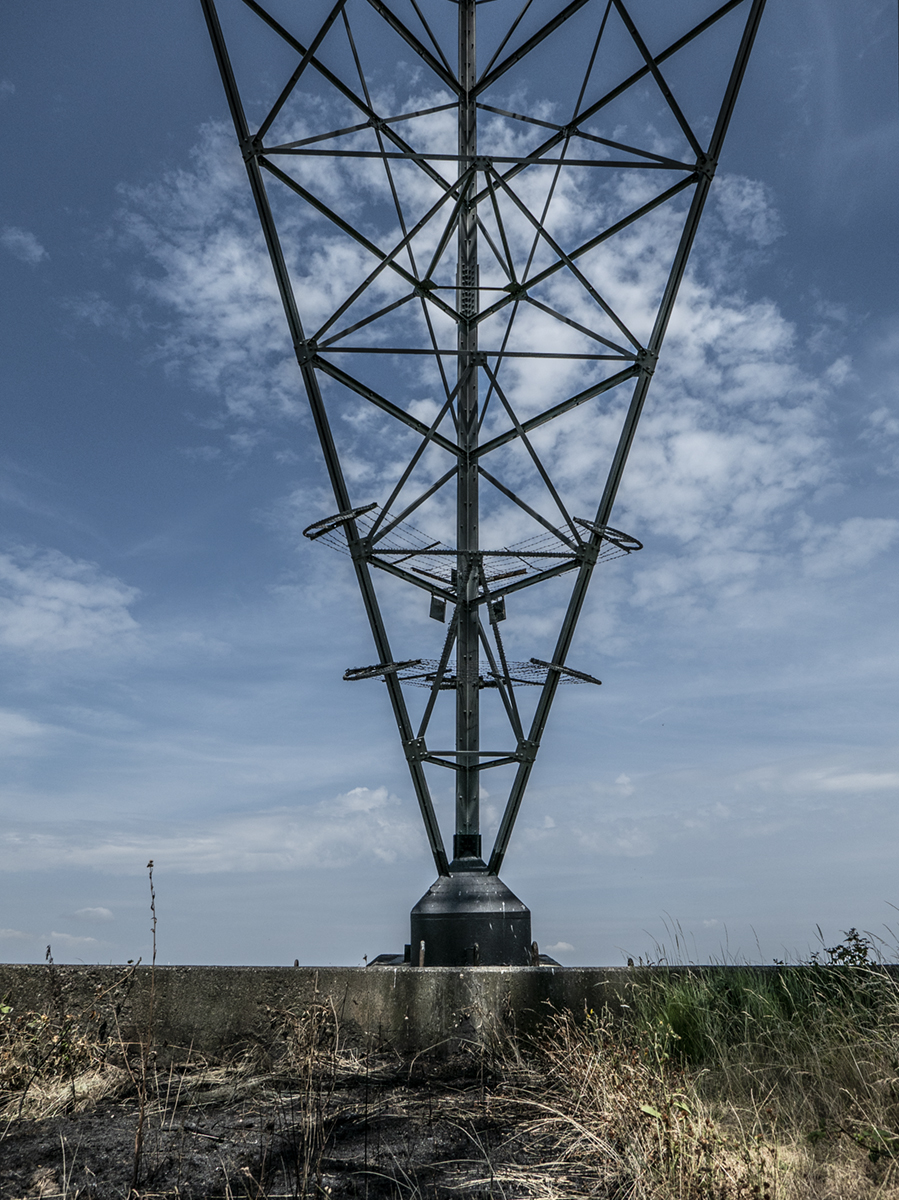
View of one of the Kent tower legs.

== See also ==
- Aust Severn Powerline Crossing
- 275 kV Forth Crossing
- List of spans
- Powerline river crossings in the United Kingdom
- Crossings of the River Thames
