= Cambus, Clackmannanshire =

Village in Clackmannanshire, Scotland

Coordinates: 56.123685°N 3.844224°W

Cambus: Scottish Gaelic: An Camas
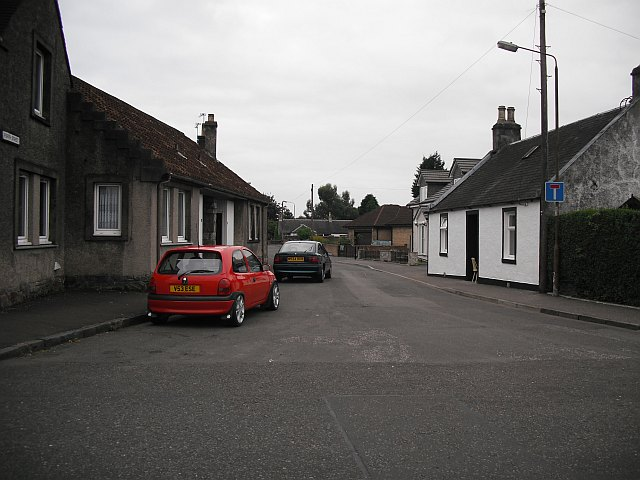

- Location within Clackmannanshire
- Population: (2001 census)
- OS grid reference: NS855940
- Council area: Clackmannanshire
- Lieutenancy area: Clackmannanshire
- Country: Scotland
- Sovereign state: United Kingdom
- Post town: ALLOA
- Postcode district: FK10
- Police: Scotland
- Fire: Scottish
- Ambulance: Scottish
- UK Parliament: Alloa and Grangemouth
- Scottish Parliament: Clackmannanshire and Dunblane

Cambus (from Scottish Gaelic An Camas, meaning the bend in the river) is a village near Alloa, Clackmannanshire. It is located to the south of Tullibody, to the northwest of Alloa, and about 4 miles east of Stirling, across the river. It lies on the River Devon, near its confluence with the River Forth.

== Distillery ==
A whisky distillery was founded in Cambus in 1806. It or another was re-established by John Mowbray in 1813 or perhaps 1836. In 1877 ownership was merged into the Distillers Company. The distillery was closed down in 1993. There is a song about Cambus Whisky which mentions "sober Sandy" who was reportedly a ballman at the distillery.

The Cambus Iron Bridge over the Devon was constructed in the early 19th century to span the River Devon and link with the distillery founded in 1806. It is a Category A listed building and a scheduled monument.

Security is a concern for any distillery, and in at least the 1950s the Cambus distillery was guarded at night by a flock of geese, with their wings clipped to prevent flight. During the day, to prevent the workforce being attacked, the geese were kept in an enclosure across the road, and were generally found to be intimidating by passers-by. This would have been intended to deter any would-be thieves. The degree of success is unknown, however nowadays the sign of a conventional security company is displayed on the perimeter of the site.

== Brewery ==
Robert Knox & Son brewed in Cambus. Some of their beer labels still survive.

== Famous Inhabitants ==
Magnus Pyke formerly lived in Cambus, close to the station and distillery.

== Rail connections ==
From the early 1850s until 1968 Cambus was served by passenger trains of the Stirling and Dunfermline Railway. The station was to the west of the level crossing on the road into the village, and had a large signal box, which controlled two level crossings, the junction with the line to Menstrie and Alva, and access to sidings in the brewery and distillery. The line was re-opened in 2008 as part of the Stirling-Alloa-Kincardine rail link. The new railway has a passing loop to the east of the road into Cambus village, but no station at this point in time.

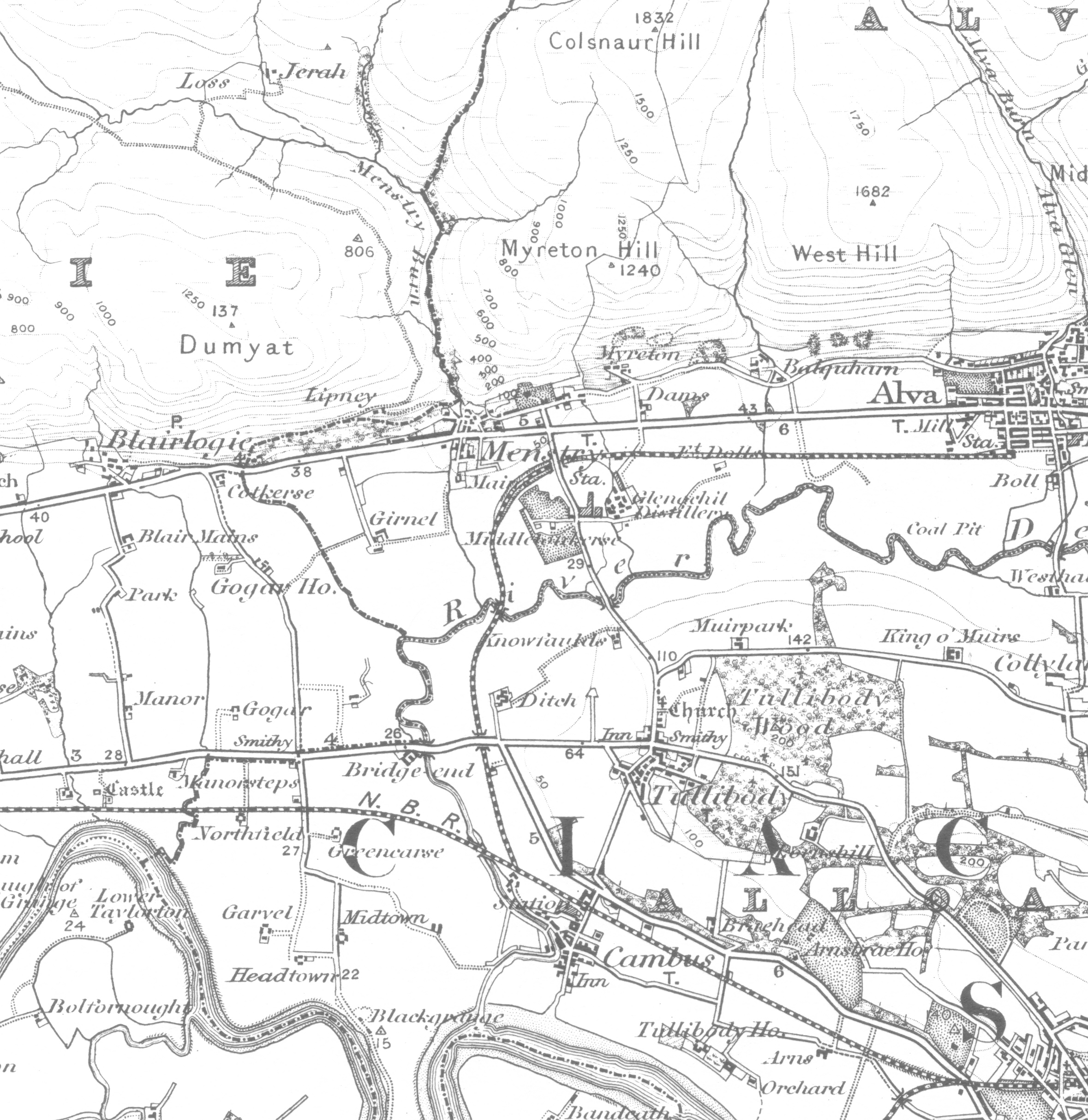
Cambus in 1895

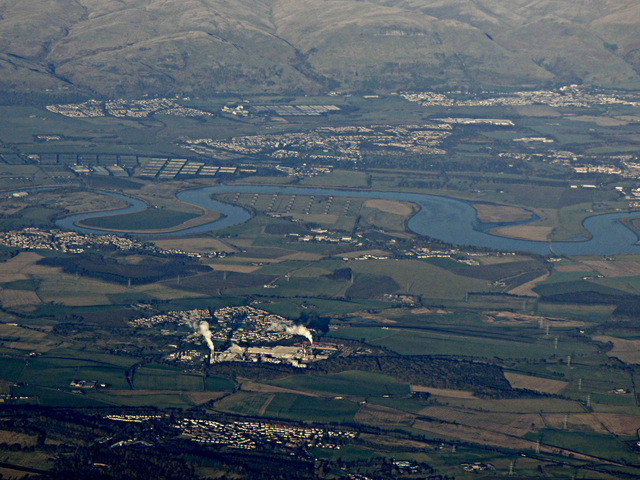
Tullibody with Menstrie and Alva at the foot of the Ochils beyond it. The bonded warehouses at Cambus, and Tullibody Inch are nearer the photographic position in the air above Cowie. Meanders on the Forth and the remains of Alloa Swing Bridge from Throsk are also visible.
