= Powerline river crossings in the United Kingdom =

In the United Kingdom, powerlines cross rivers and estuaries either in the form of overhead lines or with cables carried in tunnels. Overhead power lines are supported on towers (called pylons in the UK) which are usually significantly taller than overland pylons and are more widely spaced to cross the river in a single span. Tall pylons ensure that the electricity cables which they support provide an adequate safety clearance for river traffic.

== Overhead crossings ==
The tallest and longest overhead power line river crossings in the United Kingdom are:

The tallest electricity pylons in the UK are those of the 400 kV Thames Crossing, at West Thurrock, which are 190 m (630 ft) high. These were constructed by BICC in 1965. The cables stretch 1300 m (4,500 ft) across the River Thames and have a minimum clearance of 76 m (250 ft). There are two 400 kV circuits that connect Littlebrook substation on the south bank to West Thurrock substation on the north side.

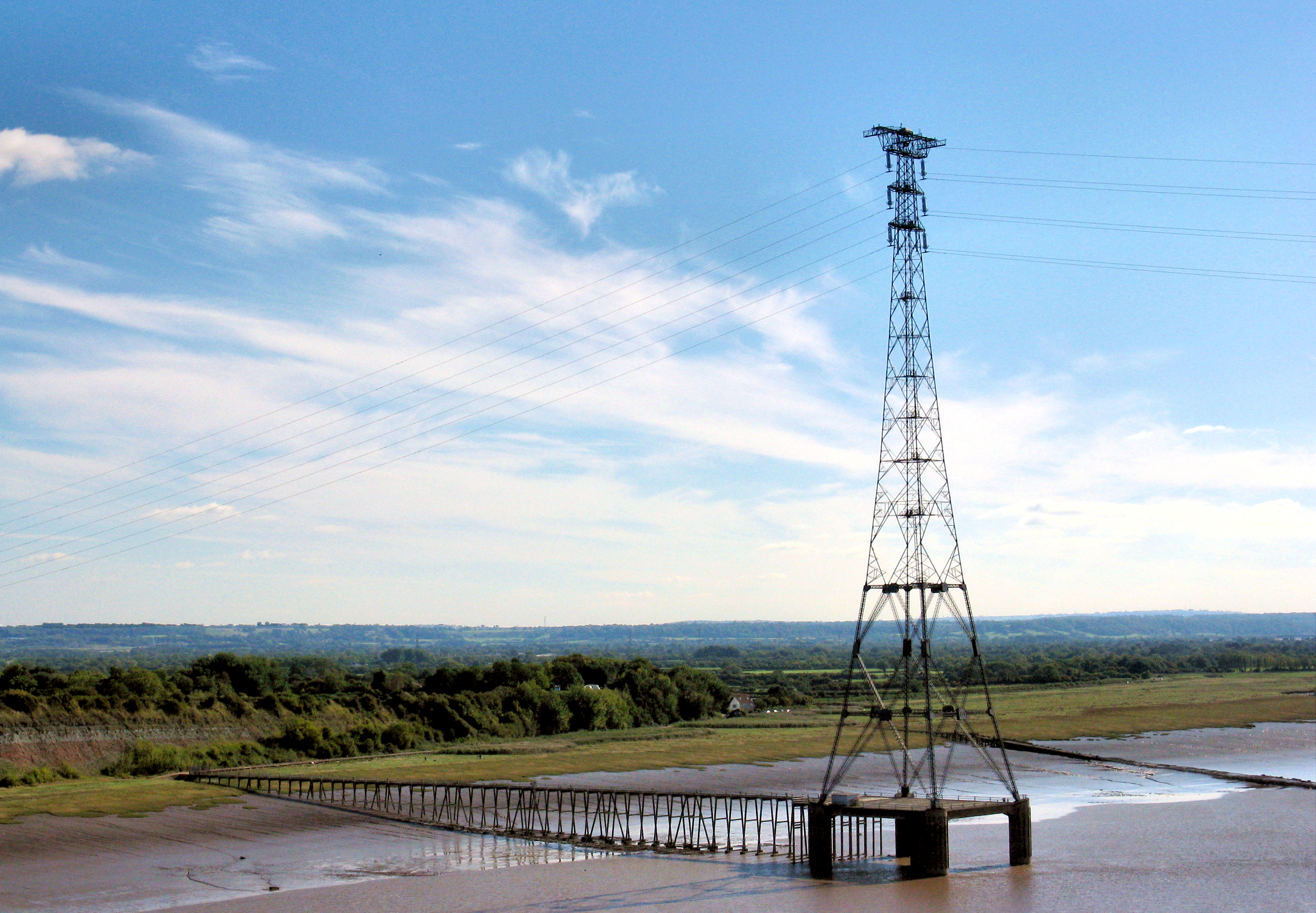
The Aust Severn Powerline Crossing cables leaving this Aust pylon run for one mile to a similar pylon at Beachley

The longest powerline river crossing in the UK is the Aust Severn Powerline Crossing over the River Severn at Aust, stretching 1700 m (5,310 ft) between towers 148 m (488 ft) high. The line was commissioned in 1959 and comprises two 275 kV electricity circuits forming part of the line between Iron Acton and Whitson substations. This pylon crossing is paralleled by the Severn-Wye Cable Tunnel beneath it, at almost the same location.

=== List of overhead powerlines ===
This is an incomplete list of overhead powerline river crossings in the UK.

Overhead powerline river crossings in the UK
River	Location	Span (m)	Height of towers (m)	Clearance (m)	Notes	References
Blyth	Blyth, Northumberland	389 (275 kV), 352 (66 kV)			1 × double 275 kV, 1 × single 275 kV, 1 × double 66 kV, 1 × single 66 kV, 1 × single ? kV	
Cleddau Ddu	Burton, Pembrokeshire	583			1 × single 132 kV	
Forth	Alloa, Clackmannanshire	425, 462			2 × single 275 kV	
Forth	Kincardine Bridge, Clackmannanshire	1,130	137 & 154		1 × single 275 kV, see 275 kV Forth Crossing	
Loughor	Bryn, Carmarthenshire and Swansea	406 (upper crossing), 377 (lower)			1 × single 132 kV, 1 × single 132 kV	
Mersey	Fiddlers Ferry, Warrington	250			1 × single 275 kV	
Ness	Inverness, Highland				1 × double 275 kV, 1 × double 132 kV, 1 × double 132 kV, 1 × double 33 kV	
Orwell	Cliff Quay, Suffolk	417 (upper), 444 (lower)		45	2 × triple 132 kV (unusual triple circuit on each crossing)	
Ouse	Blacktoft, East Riding of Yorkshire	528			2 × double 400 kV	
Ribble	Preston, Lancashire	222			1 × double 400 kV, 1 × single 400 kV, 2 × double 132 kV, 1 × double 33 kV	
Severn	Arlingham, Gloucestershire	639 + 639			2 × single 132 kV (crosses river twice)	
Severn	Aust, Gloucestershire	1,700	148		1 × double 275 kV, commissioned in 1959, see Aust Severn Powerline Crossing	
Soar	City of Leicester	265			3 × double 132 kV	
Tamar & Tavy	Weir Quay & Carr Green, Devon and Cornwall	553 (400 kV), 635 (132 kV)			1 × single 400 kV, 1 × double 132 kV	
Tay & Earn	Easter Rhynd, Perth and Kinross	425, 380			1 × single 275 kV, 1 × single 132 kV	
Tees	Teesport, Stockton on Tees	542			1 × single 400 kV	
Thames	Thurrock, Essex and Littlebrook, Kent	1,300	190	76	2 × double 400 kV. Constructed by BICC in 1965. See 400 kV Thames Crossing	
Thames	Crossness, Bexley & Dagenham, Barking and Dagenham	933	148.4		Former 132 kV. Installed 1927-32, dismantled 1987.	
Trent	Walcot, North Lincolnshire	944 (upstream) 1022 (downstream)			2 × double 400 kV	
Tyne	Jarrow, Tyne and Wear	800	128		1 × single 275 kV	
Tyne	Stella, Tyne and Wear	524 (longest crossing)			1 × double 400 kV, 2 × double 275 kV, 2 × double 132 kV	
Tywi	Penken, Carmarthenshire	359 (400 kV), 206 (132 kV)			2 × double 400 kV, 1 × single 132 kV	
Yare	Trowse, Norwich, Norfolk		72.5		132 kV. Dismantled 2017	

== Cable tunnel river crossings ==
In addition to overhead powerline river crossings, there are also underground powerline river crossings.

=== River Thames ===
Tunnels under the River Thames, from east to west are:

- Thames Cable Tunnel, between Tilbury and Gravesend, commissioned in 1970, comprising two 400 kV circuits between Tilbury and Kingsnorth substations
- Dartford Cable Tunnel, between Littlebrook substation and West Thurrock substation, constructed 2003–04, comprising two 400 kV circuits
- Barking Cable Tunnel, between Barking and Thamesmead, comprising four 33 kV circuits
- Millennium Dome electricity cable tunnel, between West Ham substation and the Millennium Dome, comprising 11 kV circuits
- Deptford River Tunnel, between Deptford and Millwall Isle of Dogs, comprising 30 11 kV circuit
- New Cross to Finsbury Market Cable Tunnel, between Bermondsey and Wapping, built between 2009 and 2017, comprises three 132 kV circuits
- Bankside river Tunnel, between Bankside and Blackfriars, connects Bankside substation and City Road substation, comprises 132 kV and 33 kV circuits
- Bankside – Charing Cross, crosses beneath Hungerford Bridge, comprises two 20 kV circuits
- Wimbledon – Pimlico Cable Tunnel, crosses the Thames between Nine Elms and Pimlico, comprises a 132 kV circuit
- Battersea Power Station Tunnels
- London Power Tunnels Kensal Green to Wimbledon, crosses the Thames between Wandsworth and Hurlingham, constructed between 2011 and 2016, comprises a single 400 kV circuit.

=== Cable tunnels under other rivers ===
Other underground tunnel cable crossings are:

- River Medway Cable Tunnels under the lower River Medway between Grain and Chetney Marshes, Kent, built between 1973–76, comprises two 400 kV circuits
- Fawley Tunnel under Southampton Water between Fawley and Chilling, built between 1962 and 1965, comprises two 400 kV circuits
- Severn-Wye Cable Tunnel under the River Severn and Wye between Aust and Newhouse, two 400 kV circuits. This runs parallel to the Severn overhead pylon crossing (see above), and was commissioned in 1972.

== Incidents ==
The 430-ft high 275kV Tyne Crossing collapsed on 16 February 1962, on the same day there was the British highest wind speed of 177mph on Lowther Hill in south-west Scotland. The pylon at Jarrow crashed at 4 a.m., and the pylon at East Howdon crashed at 5.20 a.m. The Jarrow pylon crashed onto oil pipes of the neighbouring Shell oil terminal. The North Eastern Electricity Board had planned a transmission line from Blyth to Teesside in 1958; Jarrow Borough Council wanted the cables to go underground.

It was part of the 50-mile Blyth to Lackenby 275kV line. The transmission line was built around December 1961. The crossing was rebuilt from 4 November 1962.
