= River Forth =

River in central Scotland

Forth
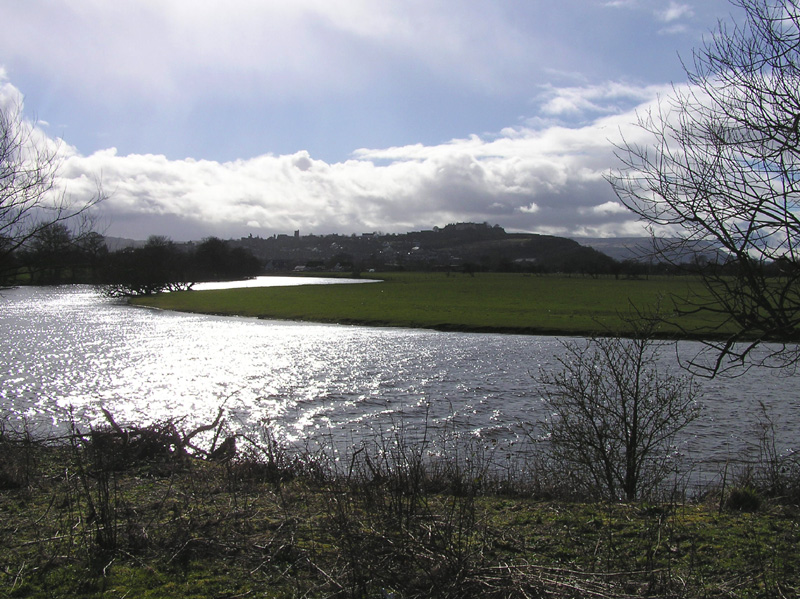
- The River Forth meanders through fertile farmlands near Stirling

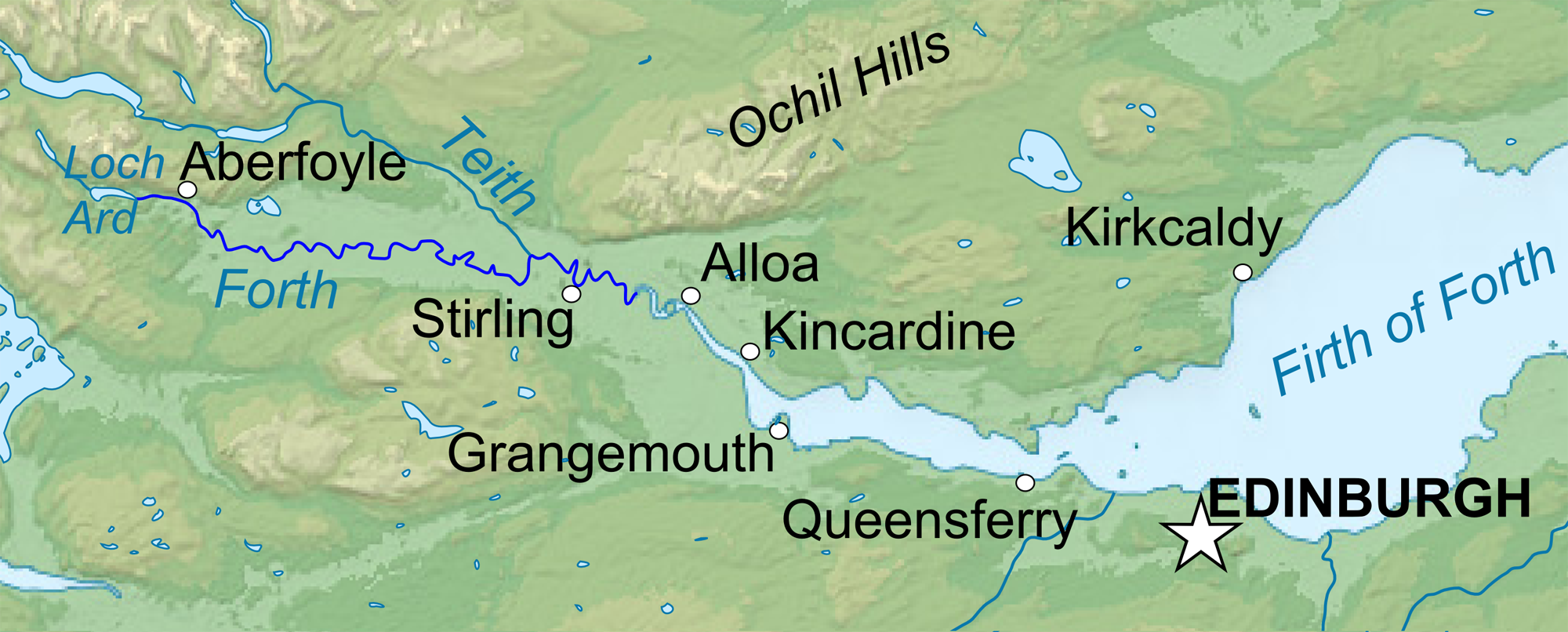
- Course of River Forth

Location
- Country: Scotland
- Councils: Stirling
- City: Stirling

Physical characteristics
- Source: Confluence of Duchray Water and the Avondhu River below Loch Ard
  - coordinates: 56°10′52″N 4°24′30″W
  - elevation: 33 m (108 ft)
- Mouth: Firth of Forth, North Sea
  - location: UK
  - coordinates: 56°03′54″N 3°43′39″W
  - elevation: 0 m (0 ft)
- Length: 47 km (29 mi)

The River Forth is a major river in central Scotland, 47 km (29 mi) long, which drains into the North Sea on the east coast of the country. Its drainage basin covers much of Stirlingshire in Scotland's Central Belt. The Gaelic name for the upper reach of the river, above Stirling, is Abhainn Dubh, meaning "black river". The name for the river below the tidal reach (just past where it is crossed by the M9 motorway) is Uisge For.

== Name ==
Forth derives from Proto-Celtic *Vo-rit-ia (slow running), yielding Foirthe in Old Gaelic.

== Course ==
The Forth rises in the Trossachs, a mountainous area 30 km (19 mi) west of Stirling. Ben Lomond's eastern slopes drain into the Duchray Water, which meets with Avondhu River coming from Loch Ard. The confluence of these two streams is the nominal start of the River Forth. From there it flows roughly eastward through Aberfoyle, joining with the Kelty Water about 5 km further downstream. It then flows into the flat expanse of the Carse of Stirling, including Flanders Moss. Just west of the M9, it is joined by the River Teith (which itself drains Loch Venachar, Loch Lubnaig, Loch Achray, Loch Katrine, and Loch Voil). The next tributary is the Allan Water, just east of the M9. From there the Forth meanders into the ancient port of Stirling. At Stirling the river widens and becomes tidal. This is the location of the last (seasonal) ford of the river. From Stirling, the Forth flows east, accepting the Bannock Burn from the south before passing the town of Fallin. It then passes two towns in Clackmannanshire: firstly Cambus (where it is joined by the River Devon), closely followed by Alloa. Upon reaching Airth (on the river's south shore) and Kincardine (on its north shore), the river begins to widen and becomes the Firth of Forth.

== Settlements on the river ==
The banks have many settlements along them, including Aberfoyle, Gargunnock, Stirling, Fallin, Cambus, Throsk, Alloa, South Alloa, Dunmore, Airth, and Kincardine. Beyond these settlements, the water turns brackish, and is usually considered part of the Firth of Forth.

== Port activities ==
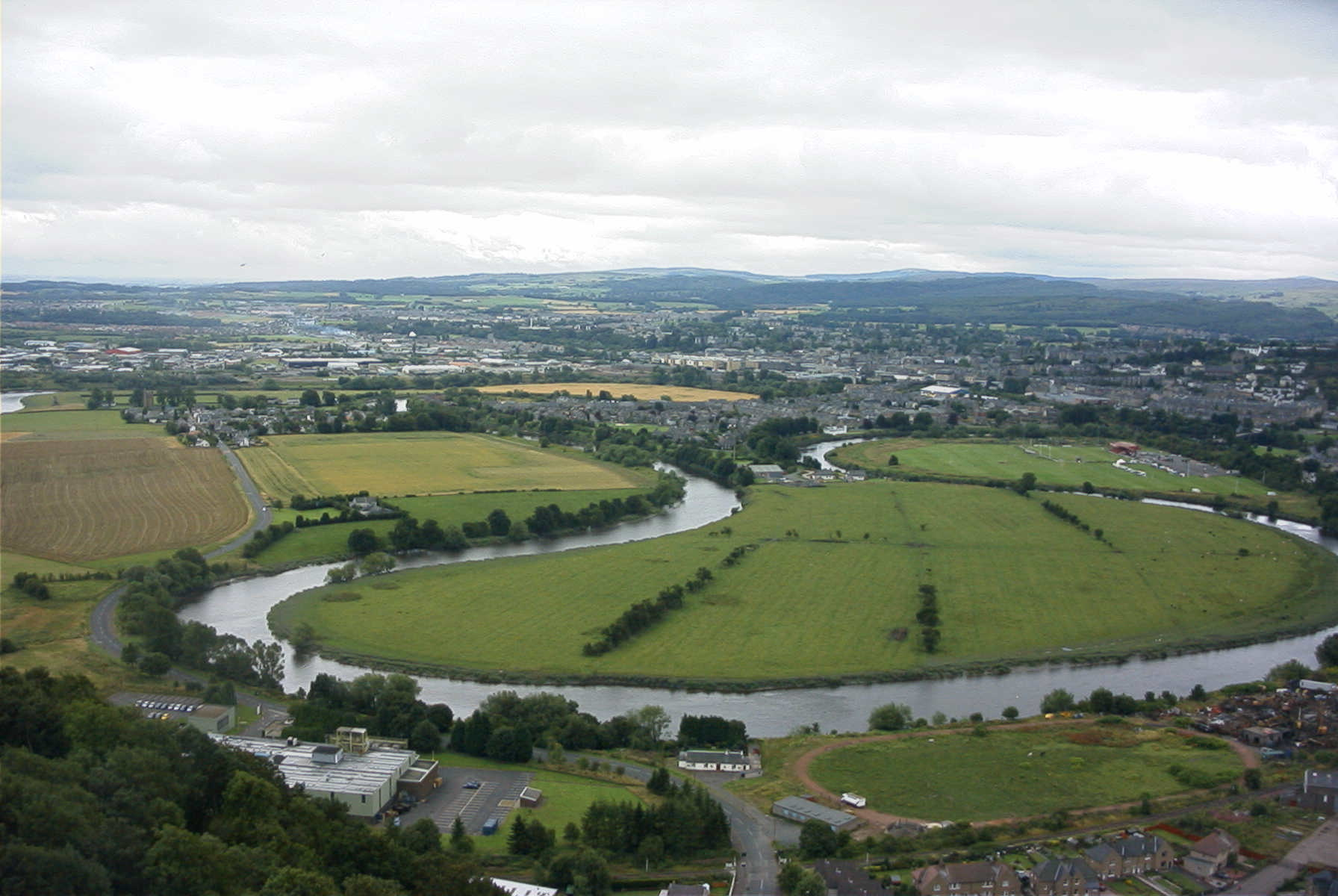
The meandering Forth viewed from the Wallace Monument. The river flows from right to left, and the former limit of navigation was in the left distance.

In the sixteenth and seventeenth centuries, Stirling harbour was a busy port, with goods coming into Scotland and being exported to Europe. As a result, Stirling had very close ties with the Hansa towns, with Bruges in Belgium, and with Veere (known at the time as Campvere) in the Netherlands. After 1707, trade with America became the new focus, and so a lot of trade activity shifted from Stirling in the east to the port of Glasgow in the west. During World Wars I and II, Stirling harbour began thriving again: It became a gateway for importing supplies of tea into Scotland. After the wars, other trade activities slowly returned, but growth was slow because the harbour's owners levied heavy shore duties on shipping, making it less economically attractive to the few agricultural merchants who were based at Stirling. Today, Stirling's harbour has fallen into disuse, but there are plans to redevelop it.

== Bridges ==
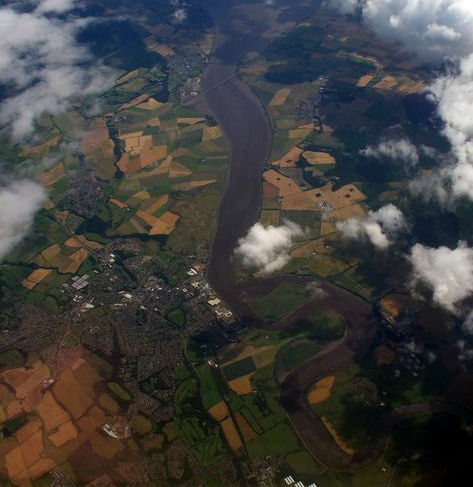
River Forth passing Cambus, Tullibody Inch, and Alloa Inch. Beyond that Alloa and Kincardine. The water is known as the Firth of Forth beyond the Clackmannanshire and Kincardine bridges although the transition point is unclear.

Upstream from Stirling, the river is rather narrow and can be crossed in numerous places. (Crossing used to be more difficult before the installation of modern drainage works, because the ground was often treacherously marshy near the riverbank.) However, after its confluence with the Teith and Allan, the river becomes wide enough that a substantial bridge is required. At Stirling, there has been a bridge over the river since at least the 13th century, and it was the easternmost road crossing until 1936, when another road crossing was opened at Kincardine. The Clackmannanshire Bridge, just upstream of the Kincardine Bridge, opened on 19 November 2008. A railway bridge, the Alloa Swing Bridge, previously connected Alloa on the northern shore with Throsk on the southern shore. It opened in 1885 and was closed and mostly demolished in 1970: Only the metal piers remain.

Much further downstream, joining North Queensferry and South Queensferry, is another railway bridge, the famous Forth Bridge, which opened in 1890, and the Forth Road Bridge, which opened in 1964. To the west of the Forth Road Bridge is Queensferry Crossing, construction of which began in 2011: It finally opened on 4 September 2017.

=== List of bridges ===
There are a total of 24 bridges crossing the River Forth:

- Manse Road Bridge
- Footbridge near Doon Hill and Fairy Knowe
- Gartmore Forth Bridge
- A81 Road Bridge
- Disused Railway Viaduct near Gartmore railway station
- Cardross Bridge
- Poldar Bridge
- Bridge of Frew
- Gargunnock Bridge
- Old Drip Bridge
- New Drip Bridge
- M9 Road Bridge
- Old Mills Farm Footbridge and Pipeline
- Stirling Old Bridge
- Stirling New Bridge
- Stirling Forth Viaduct
- Cambuskenneth Footbridge
- A91 Road Bridge
- Alloa Swing Bridge
- Clackmannanshire Bridge
- Kincardine Bridge
- Queensferry Crossing
- Forth Road Bridge
- Forth Bridge

== Islands ==
Two islands (known as "inches") lie in the meandering estuarine waters downstream from Stirling: Tullibody Inch, near Cambus, and Alloa Inch, near Alloa. Both islands are fairly small, and are uninhabited.

== On film and television ==
1. River Forth (1956): A silent, 15-minute, black-and-white film that includes scenes of animals being herded through the streets.
2. Britain's Lost Routes with Griff Rhys Jones (2012): Episode 3 explores the difficulties that cattle drovers might have encountered at Frew, shows cows being taken across the Auld Brig, and includes aerial shots.
3. Sruth gu Sal, Episode 1: A 25-minute look at the Forth River (2 Nov 2009).

== See also ==
- 275 kV Forth Crossing
- List of rivers of Scotland
- Rivers and Fisheries Trusts of Scotland (RAFTS)
- Shipping Forecast
