= British Insulated Callender's Cables =

British cable manufacturer

- Company type: Public
- Industry: Building materials
- Founded: 1945; 81 years ago
- Defunct: 2000; 26 years ago
- Fate: Renamed
- Successor: Balfour Beatty
- Headquarters: Helsby, UK
- Products: Electrical cable

British Insulated Callender's Cables (BICC) was a major British cable manufacturer and construction company of the 20th century. It has been renamed after its former subsidiary Balfour Beatty.

BICC was created via the merger of two long established cable companies, Callender's Cable & Construction Company and British Insulated Cables, in 1945. It promptly set about expanding both its product lines and international presence; the latter was augmented by a series of acquisitions, which included the British businesses Pyrotenax Ltd, Power Securities, and Balfour Beatty, along with a variety of interests in Portugal, Spain, East Germany and Russia. During the late 1970s, BICC employed roughly 10,800 staff in manufacturing roles alone; overseas activities had come to comprise roughly half of all turnover generated by this time. Manufacturing sites included Erith, Prescot, Kirkby, Leyton, Helsby, Leigh, Melling, Wrexham, Blackley, Belfast and Huyton.

During the 1980s, the company came under increasing competitive pressure which, despite an intense focus on driving up employee productivity and high workplace standards, eventually resulted in factory closures and job losses. The 1990s led to sweeping changes being enacted, which included the sale of its housebuilding interests and the divestment of its telecommunications and power cables activities onto other parties. In early 2000, in the aftermath of its cable operations being sold, BICC renamed itself Balfour Beatty in early 2000 and has since focused on construction, management, financing and design activities amongst others.

== History ==
=== Background ===
Callender's Cable & Construction Company was founded by William Ormiston Callender in 1870. It was originally an importer and refiner of bitumen for road construction but began manufacturing insulated cables at their Erith site on the Thames in the 1880s. It played a significant role in construction of the British National Grid in the 1930s, building the 132 kV crossing of the Thames at Dagenham with overhead lines spanning 3060 feet (932m) between two 487 ft (148m) towers, and allowing 250 ft (76m) clearance for shipping. Callender's research and engineering laboratories were based at a former power station site in White City, London, close to Ormiston House, where the company's founder had lived.

British Insulated Cables, originally trading as the British Insulated Wire Company, was founded at Prescot, near Liverpool in 1890. It bought the rights to a paper-insulated power cable capable of transmitting electricity at 10,000 volts, for use at Deptford Power Station, from Sebastian Ziani de Ferranti. The company went on to acquire the Telegraph Manufacturing Company in 1902 and was renamed British Insulated Cables in 1925.

=== Formation, acquisitions, and reorganisation ===
During 1945, Callender's Cable & Construction Company and British Insulated Cables merged to form British Insulated Callender's Cables (BICC) in 1945. At the time of its formation, the business was largely focused within the British market; however, it expanded into mainland Europe and beyond during the subsequent decades. In 1975, the company was rebranded as BICC.

During the early 1950s, BICC opted to start production of mineral insulated cable; the first sales of the product were recorded in 1955. Its principal British competitor in this market, Pyrotenax Ltd, was acquired by BICC in 1966, although it was not fully integrated until 1976. During the acquisition, the company gave several pricing assurances to British regulators.

Seeking to accelerate its expansion, BICC completed numerous acquisitions. During 1969, it purchased Power Securities along with its subsidiary Balfour Beatty. The company's purchase of both Spanish and Portuguese companies developed BICC's presence in both South America and multiple parts of Africa. However, BICC's investments in former East Germany and Russia would prove to be disastrous, contributing to the wider business' poor fiscal condition at a time at which the margins across all areas of its core cable-making businesses was encountering increasing commercial pressure.

Management sought to implement the best standards in the industry, as well as to achieve a higher level of productivity than any of its global competitors. To this end, BICC embarked on a series of major investment projects, constructing several entirely new factories while most of its existing works were heavily re-structured. By the end of 1977, the company employed around 10,800 staff in the manufacturing of its core products. BICC also provided generous discounts to wholesalers, which were responsible for a large proportion of the company's sales.

In 1974, BICC was recording a turnover of £782 million across the whole group, 52 per cent of which was attributed to the activities of its overseas companies and its exports from the British market. By this point, which the company's principal activity was cablemaking, the other activities and business sectors that BICC had diversified into was accounting for an increasing proportion of its total sales. In January 1975, BICC Group was reorganised into four main companies: BICC Cables Ltd, BICC Industrial Products Ltd, BICC International Ltd and Balfour, Beatty & Co Ltd.

During the 1970s, the company had British-based works at Erith, Prescot, Kirkby, Leyton, Helsby, Leigh, Melling, Wrexham, Blackley, Belfast and Huyton (now Hi-Wire Ltd) producing electric power cables, telecommunications cables and metals. BICC's (originally Callender's) research and engineering laboratories at a former power station site in White City, London was close to Ormiston House, William Ormiston Callender's house of the 1870s. In 1988, the research and engineering facilities moved to new premises at the company's Wrexham and Helsby sites. Several of BICC's manufacturing sites were also shuttered during the 1970s and 1980s.

=== Divestments and reorientation ===
In January 1991, British Copper Refiners, a subsidiary of BICC, announced the closure of the Prescot plant, which resulted in the loss of 230 jobs. The site lay derelict for some years before being redeveloped into a retail park.

During the early 1990s, BICC purchased the housebuilder Clarke Homes. However, this acquisition came barely one year prior to a collapse of the housing market. By the middle of the 1990s, sales were down to only five hundred per year, and although no financial figures were ever published, the housing operation was believed to have suffered heavy losses. BICC opted to dispose of Clarke Homes, selling it to Westbury during 1995.

During 1999, BICC completed two major divestments; its remaining stake in telecommunications cables (both optical and metallic) was sold to Corning for $70 million, while its power cables businesses was acquired by General Cable in exchange for £275 million ($445 million).

BICC also owned construction company Balfour Beatty and, following the sale of its cable operations, BICC renamed itself Balfour Beatty in early 2000. Beyond the name change, the company's business strategy shifted considerably; beyond focusing on the construction of infrastructure projects, Balfour Beatty diversified into the financing, operation, design and management functions as well.

During 2002, Pirelli, who had acquired the Erith plant from General Cable, announced the closure of part of the site and the transfer of the production of oil-filled cable to their Eastleigh works in Hampshire.

In 2020, the BICC Cables name continued in use at the former BICC Egypt power cable plant in Giza.

== Callender's Cableworks Band ==
This was an amateur brass band, active between 1898 and 1961, of which all members were employees of Callender's at Erith. They rehearsed and performed in their leisure time, while the company in its role of patron lent its name and supplied uniforms and instruments. The band broadcast prolifically on BBC Radio in the 1920s and 1930s.

== See also ==
- Callender-Hamilton bridge
