= Tullibody Inch =

Islet in the River Forth, Clackmannanshire, Scotland

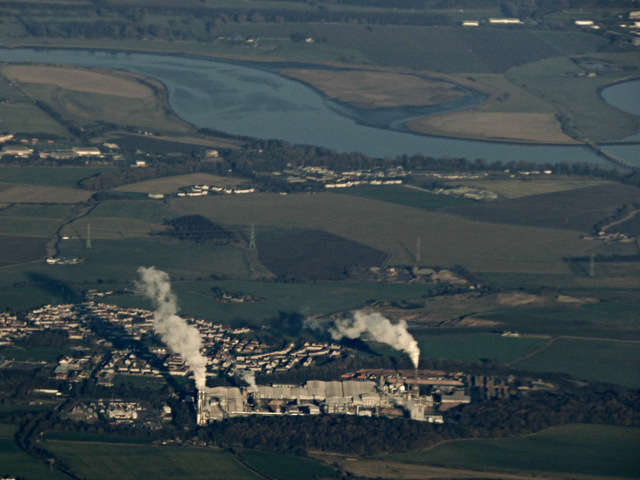
- Tullibody Inch from the air (towards top right)

Location
- Location within Scotland
- OS grid reference: NS862925
- Coordinates: 56.11121°N 3.83015°W

Name
- Name meaning: Tullibody island

Physical geography
- Island group: Forth
- Area: c.6 ha
- Highest elevation: <5 metres (16 ft)

Administration
- Council area: Clackmannanshire
- Country: Scotland
- Sovereign state: United Kingdom

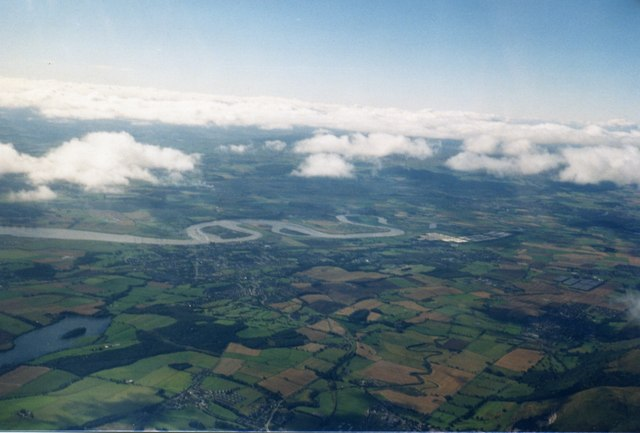
The River Forth at Alloa showing Alloa Inch and Tullibody Inch (at right)

Tullibody Inch is an islet in the estuarine waters of the River Forth. It takes its name from the nearby town of Tullibody, "inch" being from the Scottish Gaelic innis meaning "island" or "meadow".

The island used to be farmland but has become flooded due to mining subsidence. It is now part of the Firth of Forth SSSI, which also includes nearby Alloa Inch and the John Muir Country Park. The Scottish Wildlife Trust owns and manages the island as a nature reserve.

== Wildlife ==
The area is important for its extensive reed beds and for nationally important numbers of wintering wildfowl and wading birds. The inner Forth hosts populations of common shelduck, red knot, common redshank, great crested grebe, Eurasian teal and common goldeneye. A marsh harrier, of which only a handful of pairs nest in Scotland, was seen on the island in September 2006.
