= Kincardine Bridge =

Road bridge in Falkirk, Scotland

Kincardine Bridge Drochaid Chinn Chàrdain (Scottish Gaelic)
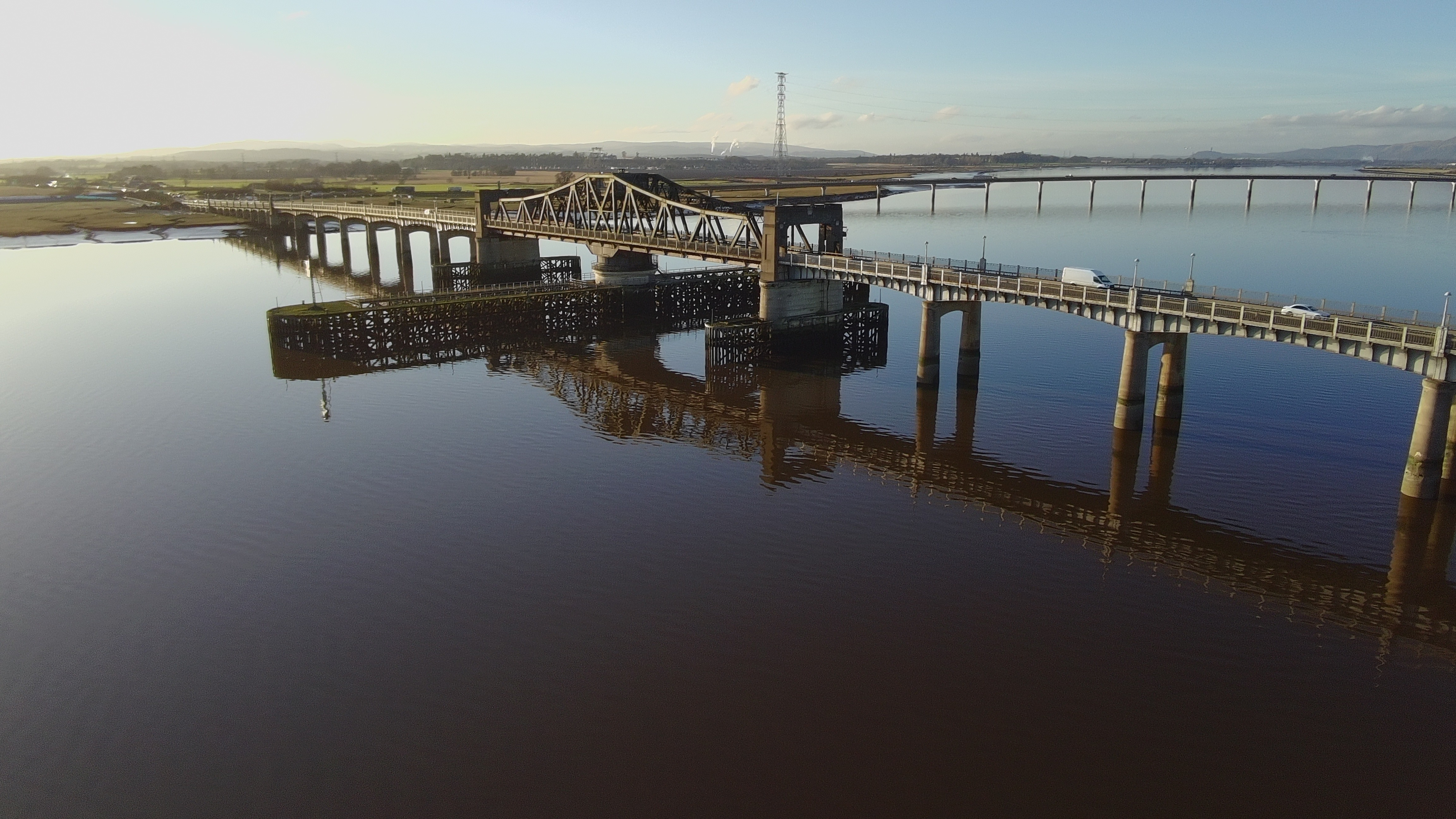
- The Kincardine Bridge on the River Forth
- Coordinates: 56°3′54.5″N 3°43′38.2″W
- Carries: A985
- Crosses: River Forth
- Locale: Falkirk; Fife
- Preceded by: Clackmannanshire Bridge
- Followed by: Queensferry Crossing

Characteristics
- Design: Swing bridge with mix of secondary span structure types
- Total length: 822 metres (2,697 ft)
- Longest span: 111 metres (364 ft)

History
- Designer: Sir Alexander Gibb & Partners
- Construction start: 1932
- Construction end: 1936

Listed Building – Category A
- Official name: Kincardine Bridge
- Designated: 23 February 2005
- Reference no.: LB50078

Location
- Interactive map of Kincardine Bridge

The Kincardine Bridge is a road bridge crossing the Firth of Forth from Falkirk to Kincardine, Fife, Scotland.

== History ==
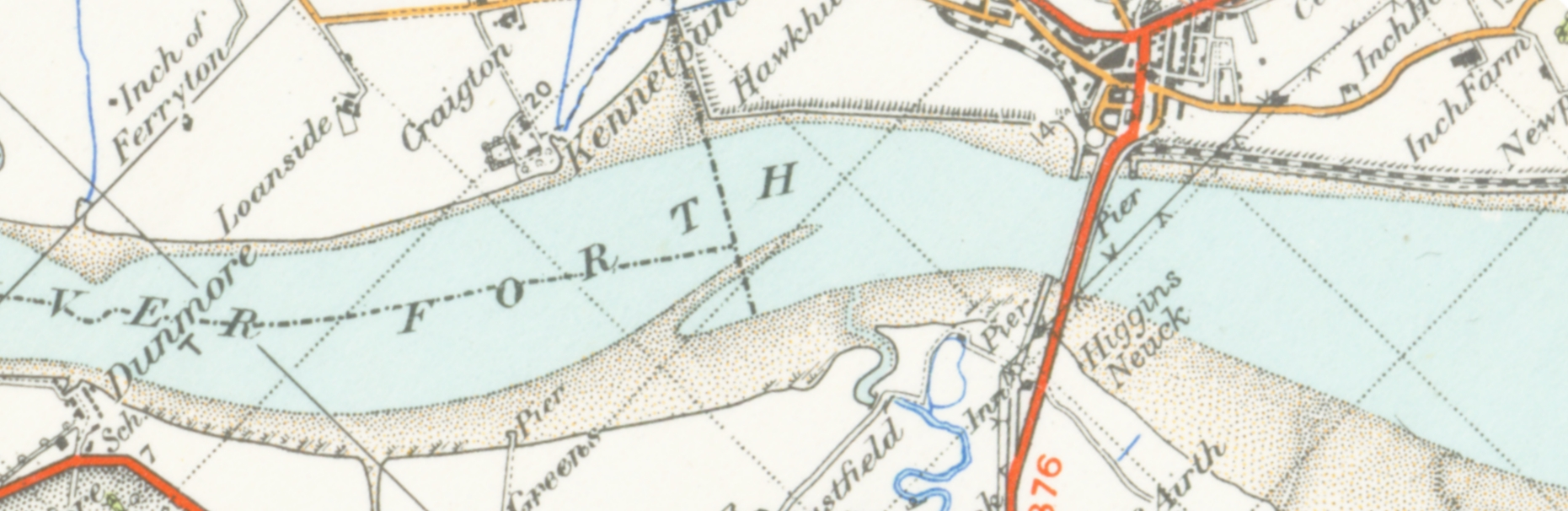
A map of the bridge and the surrounding river from 1945

The bridge was constructed between 1932 and 1936, to a design by Sir Alexander Gibb & Partners, Consulting Engineers, and Architect, Donald Watson. It was the first road crossing of the River Forth downstream of Stirling, completed nearly thirty years before the Forth Road Bridge, which stands fifteen miles (24 km) to the south-east. It first opened to traffic on 29 October 1936.

The bridge was constructed with a swinging central section which remained in use until 1988, that would allow larger ships to sail upstream to the small port at Alloa. Following a final opening on the 31 January 1988, the bridge was permanently closed, rendering it a fixed structure.

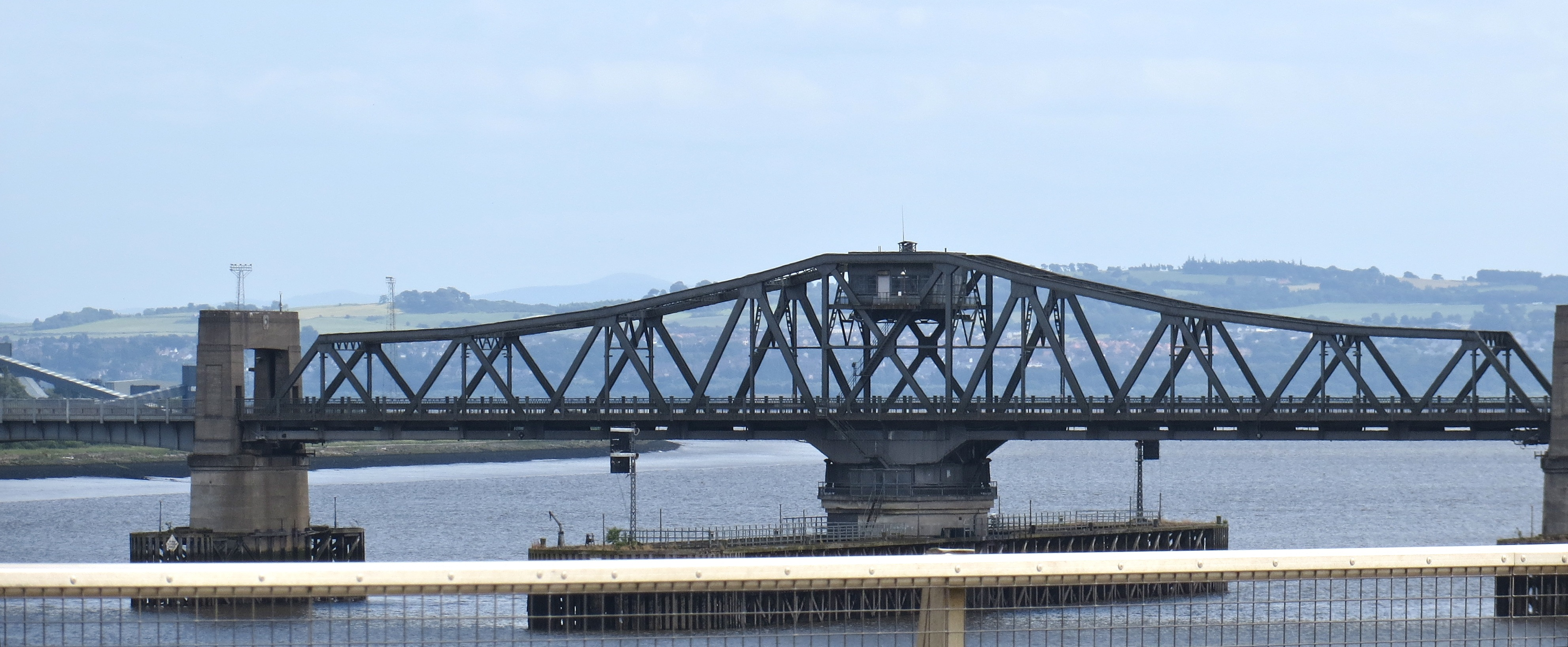
The bridge's no-longer-operable swing span viewed from the new Clackmannanshire Bridge

The bridge is part of the A985 road (formerly A876), and carries a single lane in each direction. Until the opening of the Clackmannanshire Bridge in 2008, it was the customary diversion route for traffic north from Edinburgh and eastern Scotland when the Forth Road Bridge was closed or under repair. As a result of the additional traffic using the bridge at these times, joining the high volume of regular commuter traffic, the town of Kincardine was frequently congested.

In 2023 work began to replace a section of the southern viaduct which had been assessed in 1984 as 'substandard' and reinforced in 1992 with steel supports.

== Engineering ==
Power for swinging the bridge was provided in the engine room, in the base of the centre pier, which was itself supplied with electricity from the Fife shore, by underwater cable. The swing section weighs 1,600 tons and rotates on a radial assembly of 60 solid cast steel rollers.

The entire bridge opening procedure was controlled from a beautifully maintained control room, which has retained all the original fittings and open switchboards. The control room is suspended in a superstructure of the swing section, above the road level.

The opening was controlled automatically, by the original GEC electrical switchgear.

In the engine room a 25 horsepower hydraulic pump was activated, retracting the wedges and blocking points. At this point, the central swing span would be free to rest on the rollers, thus the bridge was ready to swing. By this point, the safety gates would have also descended, blocking further traffic.

Two 50 horsepower, 440v electric motors induced rotation from large trains of gears on either side of the engine room. The initial opening process took around 2 minutes. The gearing produced a 171:1 reduction, and the bridge revolved slowly on a circular cast steel rack, with 224 machined teeth.

During the rotation, the entire 1,600 ton weight of the swing span rests upon 60 cast steel rollers in the central pier beneath the engine room. The rollers are 16 inches long, are tapered and have an average diameter of 20 inches. If the bridge was to sit with its full weight on the rollers for any length of time, the rollers would become distorted, preventing a smooth passage during the swinging process. It is for this reason that wedges are used to lift the bridge off the rollers, after each opening is completed.

While the bridge is now a fixed structure, the control and engine rooms are preserved by the Bo'ness Heritage Trust. The bridge was constructed in the open position, and during the opening ceremony in 1936, it was closed into its current position, to allow the first road vehicles to cross.

== The second bridge ==
The original bridge, at over 70 years old, was identified by the Scottish Executive as being in need of replacement. The new Clackmannanshire Bridge was opened on 19 November 2008. The original bridge was given Category A listed status by Historic Scotland in 2005, and was closed temporarily for upgrading works in 2011.

With the opening of the new bridge, the Kincardine Bridge was re-numbered as part of the A985 while the new Clackmannanshire Bridge became part of the re-routed A876, forming the Kincardine bypass.

== Maps Gallery ==
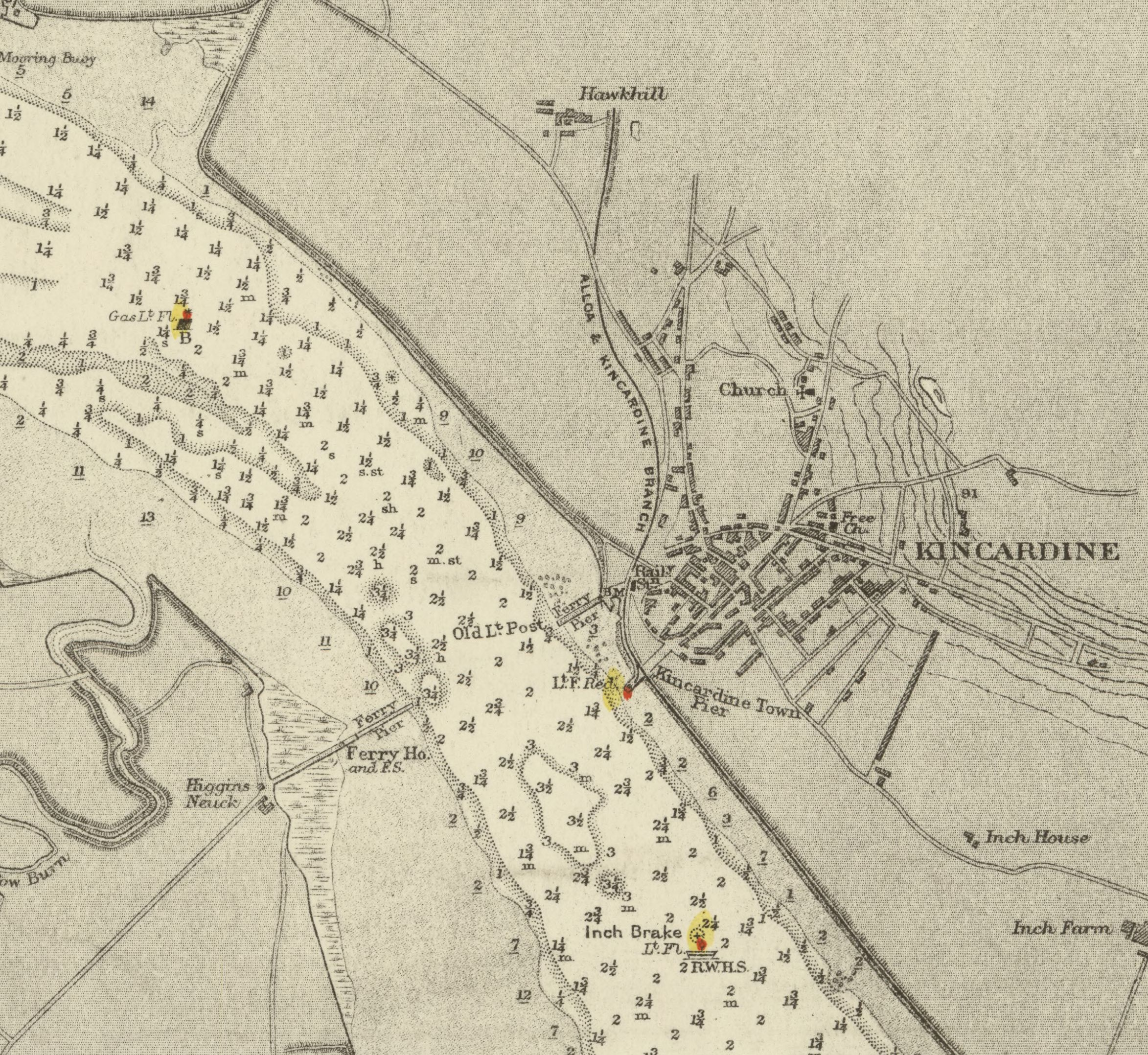
1914 nautical chart showing the ferry piers

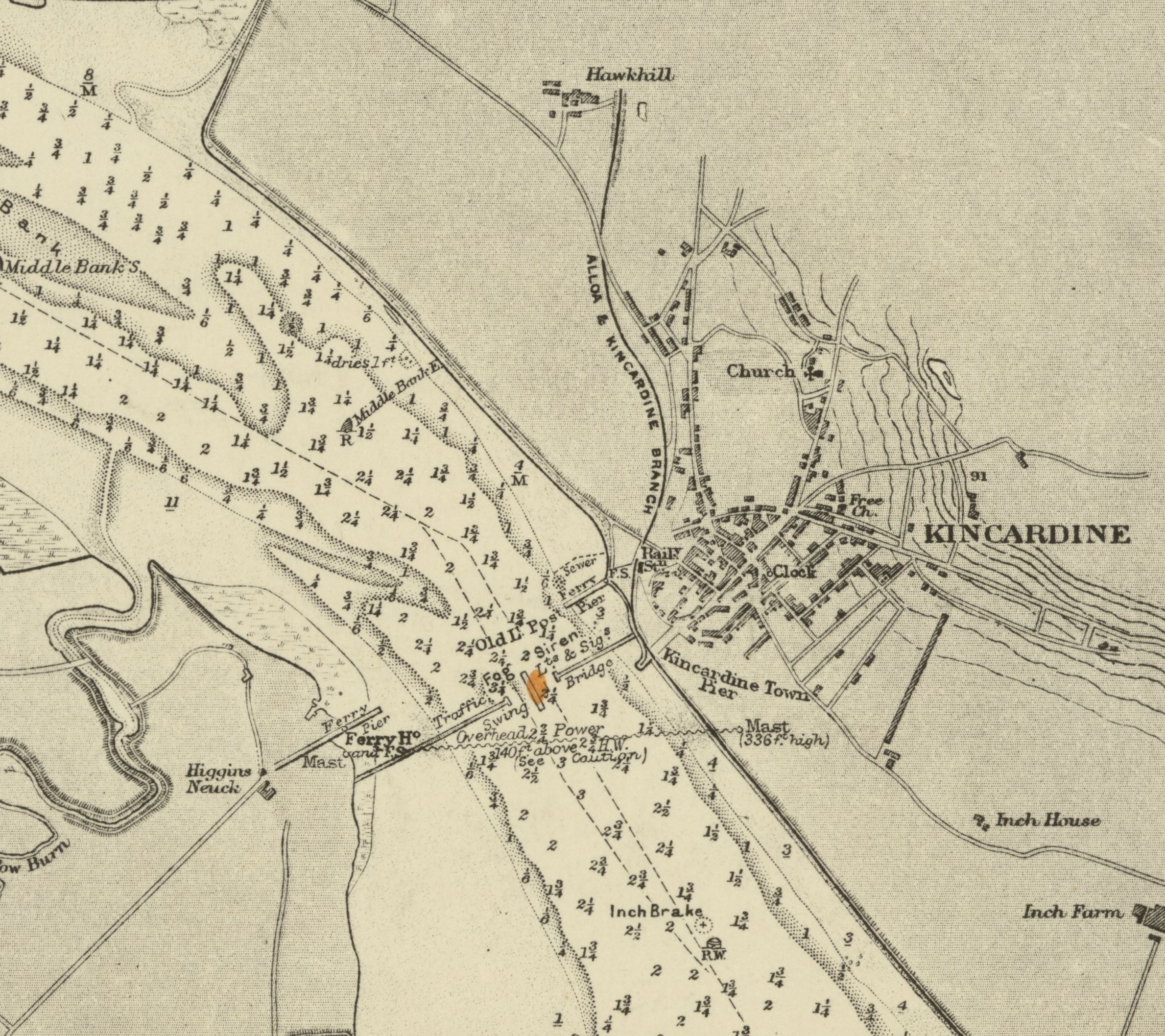
1941 nautical chart showing the swing bridge

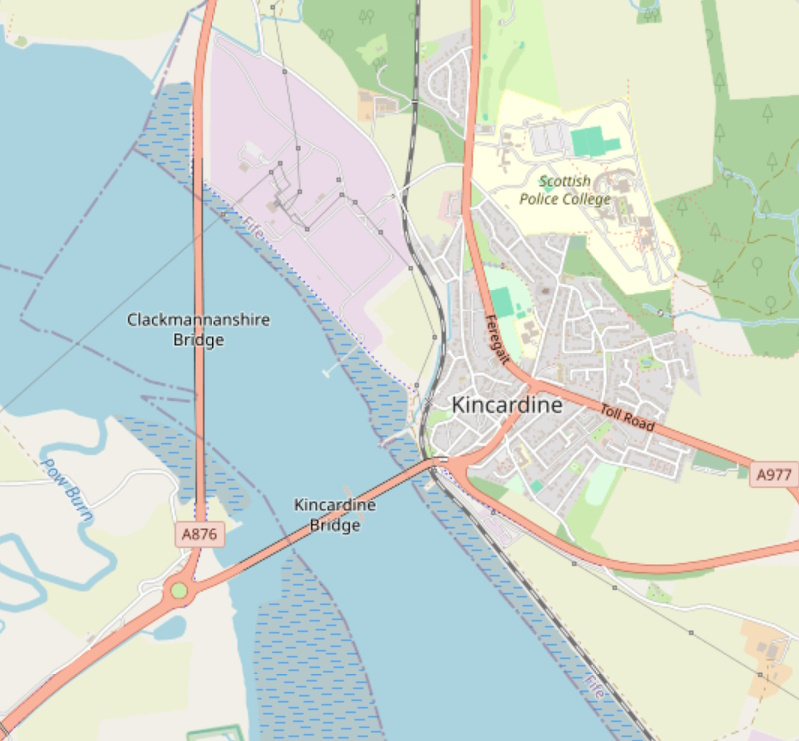
2024 map showing the two bridges

== See also ==
- 275 kV Forth Crossing
- M876 motorway
- List of bridges in Scotland
