= Alloa Inch =

Island in Scotland

Coordinates: 56°6′21″N 3°48′52″W

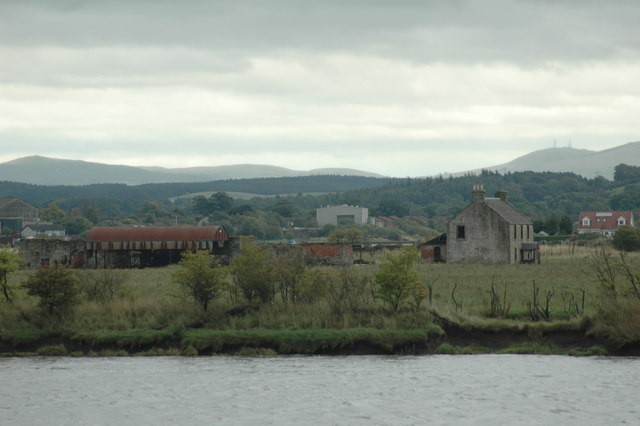
Alloa Inch, showing the ruins

Inch or Alloa Inch (Scottish Gaelic: innis, island) is an island in the tidal reaches of the River Forth near Alloa, just before the river opens out into the Firth of Forth.

There is a derelict farmhouse on the island, as the land was farmed in the past. Due to subsidence caused by nearby coal mining, flood defences were breached. The land now consists of reed beds and salt marshes.

The Scottish Wildlife Trust has managed the island as a reserve since 1996. The smaller islet of Tullibody Inch lies just upstream.

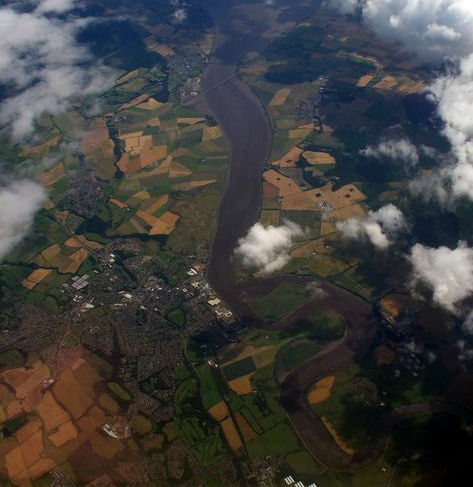
Alloa including Alloa Inch and Tullibody Inch
