= Aust Severn Powerline Crossing =

Power line span over the River Severn in Great Britain

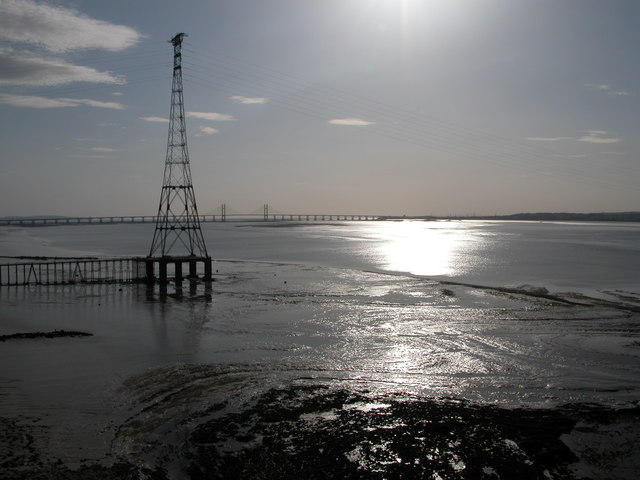
Eastern pylon at Aust, photographed from the Severn Bridge

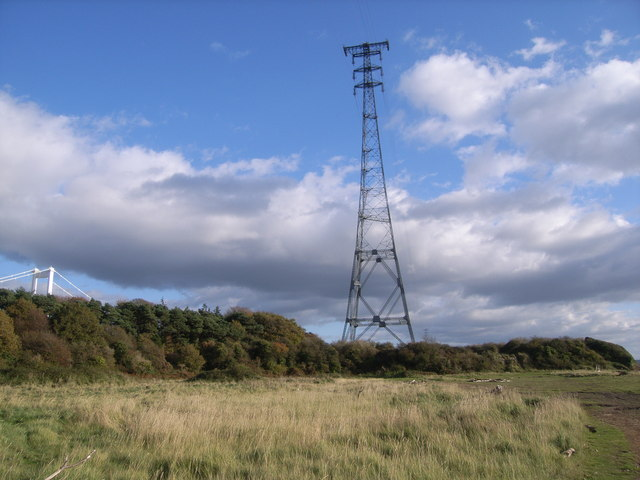
Western pylon at Beachley

Aust Severn Powerline Crossing is the longest overhead power line span in the United Kingdom with a length of 1,618 m (5,308 ft).

== History ==
The crossing spans the River Severn between Aust and Beachley and is part of the National Grid.

It was commissioned in 1959, and comprises two 275 kV electricity circuits, which form part of the 275 kV Iron Acton to Whitson line.

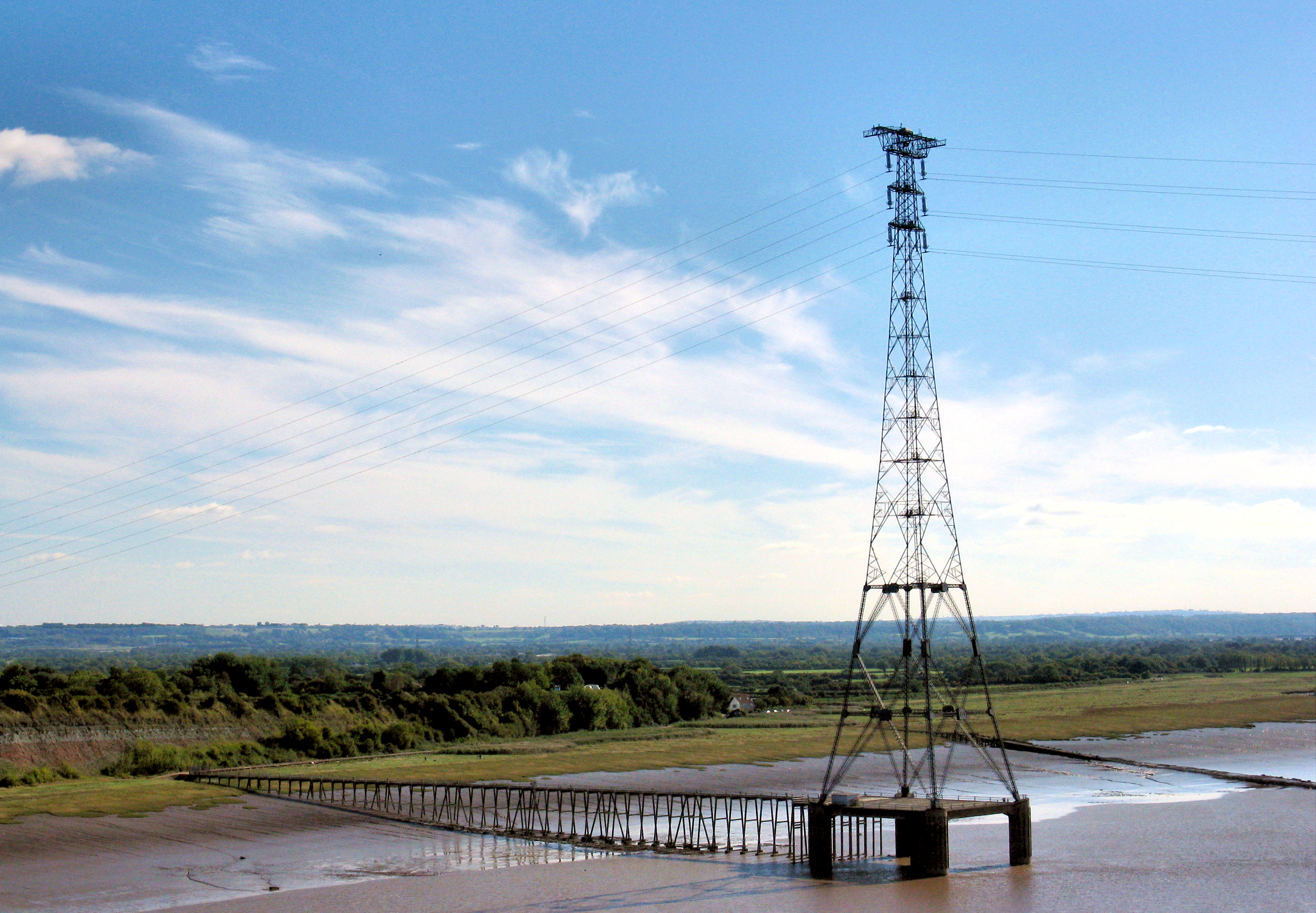
The eastern pylon at Aust

The eastern anchor pylon at Aust

== Construction ==
It is situated south of the Severn Bridge and was built by J. L. Eve Construction, which became Eve Group, and is now Babcock Networks. It is mounted on two pylons, each 148.75 m (488.0 ft) tall. The pylon on the Aust side of the River Severn stands on a caisson accessible via a small bridge.

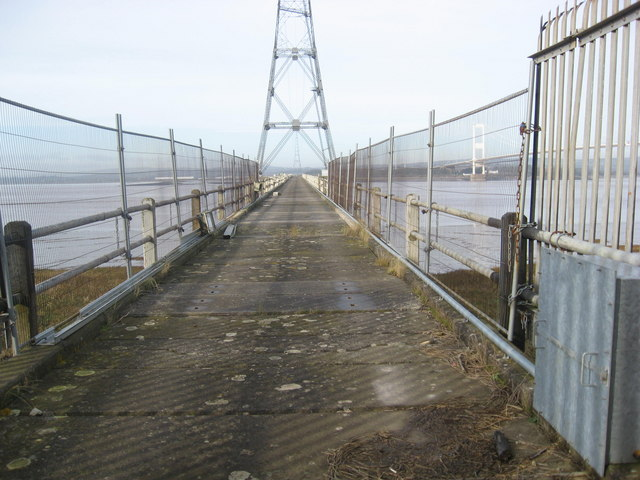
Walkway to the Aust pylon

Point	Coordinates (links to map & photo sources)	Notes
Aust pylon	51.6026°N 2.6332°W	
Mid-point	51.60578°N 2.64136°W	
Beachley pylon	51.6102°N 2.6531°W	

== See also ==
- List of spans
- Powerline river crossings in the United Kingdom
- Crossings of the River Severn
- Crossings of the River Wye
- Severn-Wye Cable Tunnel
