= Clackmannanshire Bridge =

Bridge over the Firth of Forth in Scotland

Clackmannanshire Bridge Drochaid Chlach Mhannainn (Scottish Gaelic)
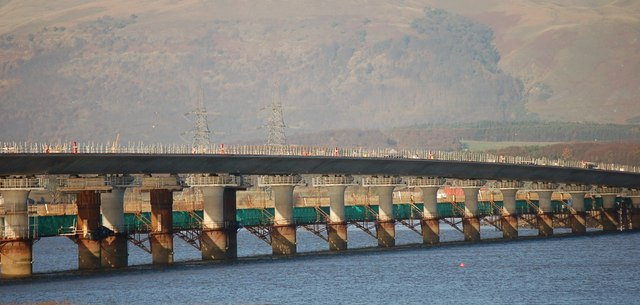
- Bridge across the Firth of Forth
- Coordinates: 56.07285°N 3.736725°W
- Carries: A876
- Crosses: Firth of Forth
- Locale: Falkirk; Fife
- Maintained by: Transport Scotland
- Preceded by: A91 road bridge
- Followed by: Kincardine Bridge

Characteristics
- Design: Concrete piers and post-tension box beam
- Total length: 1.2 km (0.75 mi)

History
- Designer: Benaim & WA Fairhurst
- Construction cost: £120 million
- Opened: 19 November 2008

Location
- Interactive map of Clackmannanshire Bridge

The Clackmannanshire Bridge (Scottish Gaelic: Drochaid Chlach Mhannainn) is a road bridge over the Firth of Forth in Scotland which opened to traffic on 19 November 2008. Prior to 1 October 2008 the bridge was referred to as the Upper Forth Crossing while the name was chosen.

== Background ==
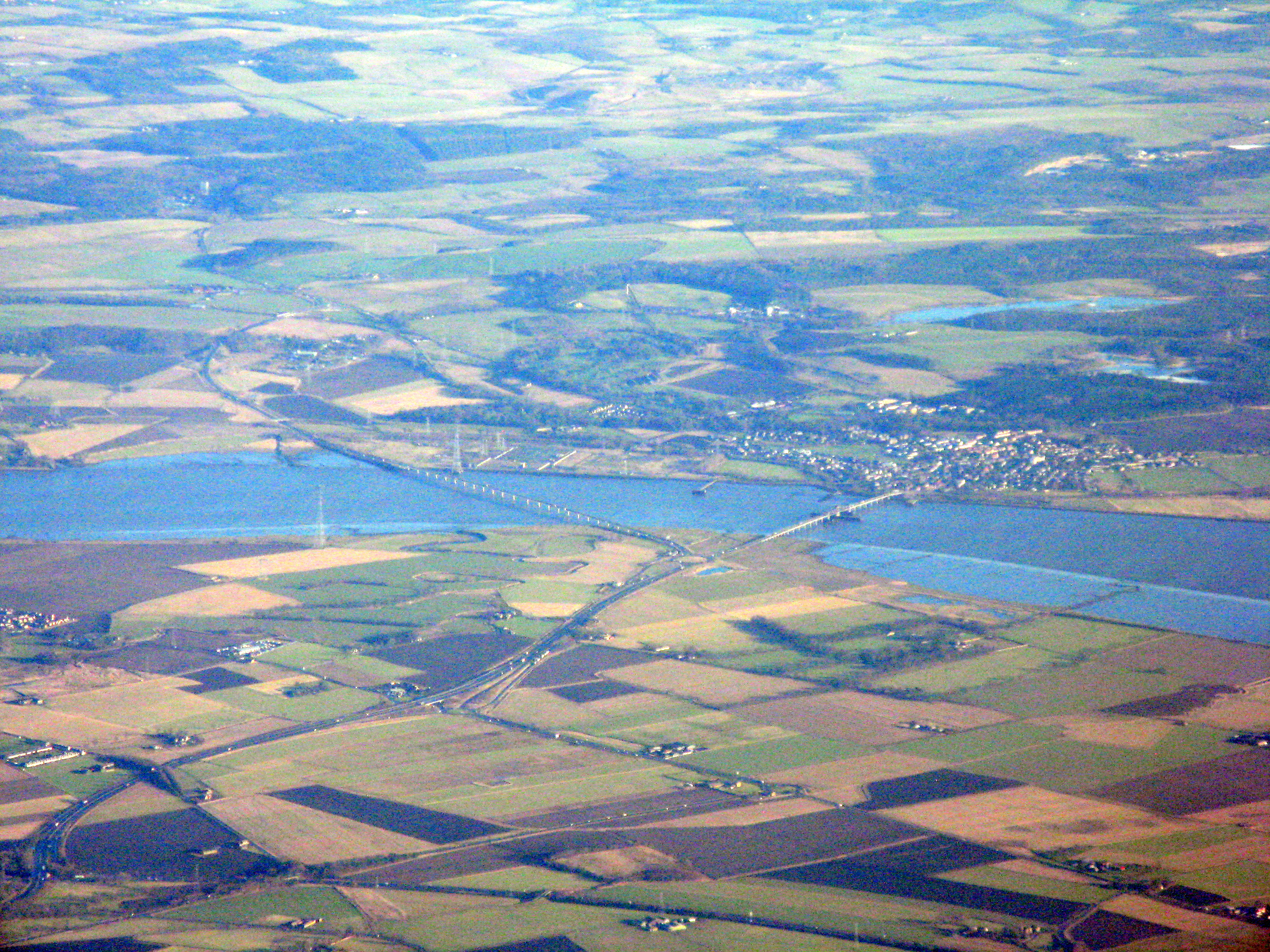
Clackmannanshire Bridge (left) over the River Forth

The increasing levels of traffic using the existing Kincardine Bridge led to a public inquiry being held into options to ease traffic flow over the Forth and around the small town of Kincardine. The Kincardine Bridge was the main access across the river for heavy goods vehicles during stormy weather when the Forth Road Bridge would not allow high-sided vehicles to cross during strong winds. In 2000 proposals were put forward for a number of alternatives, one of which was a new crossing running north-northwest of the existing bridge, bypassing the town of Kincardine altogether.

In 2005 the new crossing was given the go-ahead, and construction began in June 2006, with the sod-cutting ceremony performed by the Scottish Transport Minister, Tavish Scott, accompanied by the Earl of Elgin who as a boy had performed the ceremony for the Kincardine Bridge.

The bridge was officially opened by Scotland's First Minister Alex Salmond on 28 November 2008. At the ceremony, Salmond said: "This is a world-class infrastructure project which will cut journey times, improve central Scotland connections, and provide a unique gateway to Clackmannanshire, Fife and Falkirk".

== Description ==
The final cost of the project was £120 million and it was designed to accommodate about 20,000 vehicle movements per day. The bridge deck is 1.2 km (0.75 mi) long, weighs 35,000 tonnes (34,450 long tons; 38,580 short tons) and sits on 25 piers which are each filled with 840 tonnes (830 long tons; 930 short tons) of concrete.

== Archaeology ==
Archaeological work, undertaken by Headland Archaeology, in early 2006, in advance of the construction of the northern approach road for the bridge found evidence of human occupation of the area from between the Early Neolithic and Medieval periods. The archaeologists found the largest (206 vessels) and best-dated assemblage of Middle Neolithic Impressed Ware in Scotland, to that date. Other notable finds were four Early to Middle Bronze Age roundhouses dating to c 1750‒1300 BC; a large pit containing parts of at least 37 pots, and two large double-ring roundhouses, an oval building, and ancillary structures and features dating to the Middle to Late Bronze Age i.e. 1300‒900 BC. There is also evidence of activity during the Iron Age and two medieval corn-drying kilns.

== Naming ==
The bridge is positioned in an area where three council area boundaries converge. The north approach road to the bridge leaves from Clackmannanshire, the bridge itself standing in Fife, and the south approach to the bridge is within Falkirk. This means that the span of the bridge is within Fife; however, it can only be accessed by travelling through either Clackmannanshire or Falkirk council areas. Due to this unique situation a minor row over naming broke out between those local authorities with a vested interest. Clackmannanshire Council voted to suggest "Clackmannanshire Bridge" - even though two other councils, Fife and Falkirk, are involved and no part of the bridge would be inside the Clackmannanshire area. Fife Council responded with "Kingdom Bridge" (referring to the historic kingdom of Fife). Other suggestions included "Wallace Bridge" after Sir William Wallace. Following a public consultation, the Scottish Government announced on 1 October 2008 that the name Clackmannanshire Bridge was to be adopted.

== See also ==
- List of bridges in Scotland
