= Kincardine, Fife =

Town in Fife, Scotland

Coordinates: 56.069°N 3.719°W

Kincardine: Scottish Gaelic: Cinn Chàrdainn
- Location within Fife
- Population: 2,940 (2020)
  - Edinburgh: 22 mi (35 km)
  - London: 347 mi (558 km)
- Civil parish: Tulliallan
- Council area: Fife
- Lieutenancy area: Fife
- Country: Scotland
- Sovereign state: United Kingdom
- Post town: ALLOA
- Postcode district: FK10
- Dialling code: 01259
- Police: Scotland
- Fire: Scottish
- Ambulance: Scottish
- UK Parliament: Dunfermline and Dollar
- Scottish Parliament: Dunfermline

Kincardine (/kɪnˈkɑːrdɪn/ kin-KAR-din; Scottish Gaelic: Cinn Chàrdainn) or Kincardine-on-Forth is a town on the north shore of the Firth of Forth, in Fife, Scotland. The town was given the status of a burgh of barony in 1663. It was at one time a reasonably prosperous minor port. The townscape retains many good examples of Scottish vernacular buildings from the 17th, 18th and early 19th centuries, although it was greatly altered during the construction of Kincardine Bridge in 1932–1936. It is in the civil parish of Tulliallan.

== Etymology ==
The name Kincardine, recorded in 1540 as Kincarne, may be of either Pictish or Gaelic origin (It is also recorded as Kincarnyne). The second element is Pictish *carden, conceivably loaned into Gaelic, meaning "woodland" or perhaps "enclosure, encampment" (Middle Welsh cardden). The first element is the Gaelic ceann, "head end", but in view of the second element's "Pictish" distribution, it is most appropriately seen as an adaptation or translation of the cognate Pictish *pen, of the same meaning (Welsh pen), and the original form may have been *Pencarden.

== Transport ==
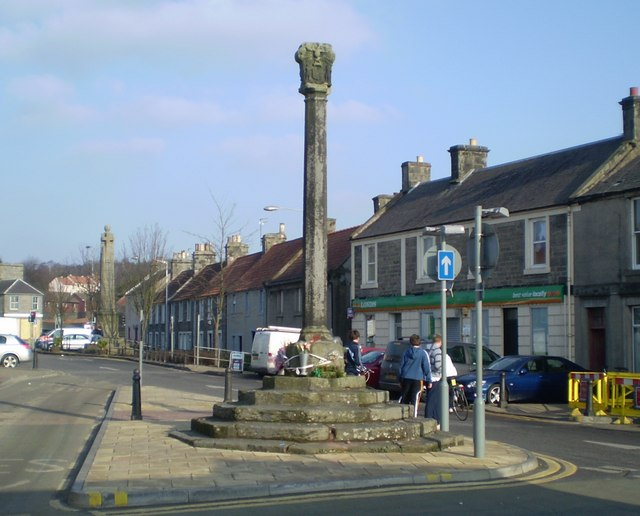
The Mercat cross at Kincardine, 2007

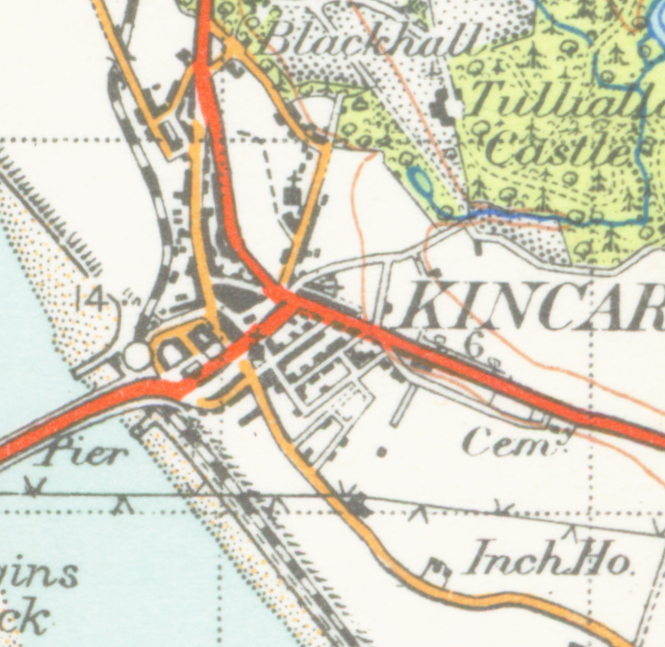
A map of Kincardine from 1945

Kincardine Bridge runs south from Kincardine. It is the main crossing-point of the Firth of Forth between the Queensferry Crossing and Stirling. Kincardine Bridge used to be a swing bridge and opened to large ships, but this was closed in a final ceremony in 1988. The bridge had seven spans made of steel. There was a large control room at the top of the bridge, this used to be staffed to allow the operators to open the bridge to large ships and river traffic. In 2005, it was given Category A listed status by Historic Scotland.

During the last several decades, the town has suffered from increased congestion due to the increase of vehicles using the bridge. This heavy congestion was reduced in 2005 by the opening of an eastern bypass connecting the Kincardine bridge with the A985 Inverkeithing/Forth Road Bridge artery. In 2008 the western section of the town was bypassed with the opening of the Clackmannanshire Bridge.

== Police ==
Kincardine is also the location of the Scottish Police College at Tulliallan Castle on the outskirts of the town.

== People ==
The chemist and physicist, James Dewar, was born in Kincardine in 1842.

- James Dewar
- Shirley Henderson
- Greg Shields
- Stewart Kennedy
- Jim Lister
