= List of high-voltage underground and submarine cables =

This is a list of high voltage (above 150 kV) AC electrical transmission lines. This list is incomplete.

For high-voltage direct current, both underground and submarine, see List of HVDC projects.

== Austria ==
Facility	Length (km)	Year of inauguration	Voltage	Coordinates of endpoints
Vienna/Substation-South – Vienna/Kendlergasse	?	1984	380 kV	48.1651°N 16.3312°E ; 48.2052°N 16.3111°E
Vienna/Kendlergasse – Simmering	?	?	380 kV	48.2052°N 16.3111°E ; 48.1813°N 16.4338°E
Vienna/Substation-North – Vienna/Dr.-Nekowitschstrasse	5,5	2006	380 kV	48.2576°N 16.3900°E ; 48.2968°N 16.3958°E
Vienna/Substation-South – Vienna-South Cable Terminal	?	?	380 kV	48.1651°N 16.3312°E ; 48.1362°N 16.3406°E

== Belgium ==
Facility	Length (km)	Year of inauguration	Voltage	Coordinates of endpoints
Van Maerlant Substation – Gezelle Substation	9.8	2017	380 kV	51.2273°N 3.3156°E;51.2636°N 3.2011°E
Nemo Link Converter Station – Gezelle Substation	0.8	2018	380 kV	51.2650°N 3.2097°E;51.2636°N 3.2011°E
Nobelwind Offshore Substation – Northwind Offshore Substation	12.7	2016	220 kV	51.6900°N 2.8254°E;51.6198°N 2.9177°E
Northwind Offshore Substation – Stevin Substation	41.6	2016	220 kV	51.6198°N 2.9177°E;51.3260°N 3.1841°E
Norther Offshore Substation – Stevin Substation	27.6	2019	220 kV	51.5135°N 2.9915°E;51.3260°N 3.1841°E
Rentel Offshore Substation – Stevin Substation	40.3	2019	220 kV	51.5756°N 2.9189°E;51.3260°N 3.1841°E
OSY1 Offshore Substation – Stevin Substation	39.9	2019	220 kV	51.5824°N 2.8686°E;51.3260°N 3.1841°E
Rentel Offshore Substation – OSY1 Offshore Substation	4.1	2019	220 kV	51.5756°N 2.9189°E;51.5824°N 2.8686°E
Seastar Offshore Substation – OSY1 Offshore Substation	6.7	2020	220 kV	51.6242°N 2.8444°E;51.5824°N 2.8686°E
Mermaid Offshore Substation – OSY1 Offshore Substation	21.6	2020	220 kV	51.7120°N 2.7238°E;51.5824°N 2.8686°E
Northwester 2 Offshore Substation – OSY1 Offshore Substation	17.2	2020	220 kV	51.6882°N 2.7593°E;51.5824°N 2.8686°E
Sources: Elia, OpenInfraMap, HoogspanningsNet

== Belgium/Germany ==
Facility	Length (km)	Year of inauguration	Voltage	Coordinates of endpoints
Aachen Liege Electricity Grid Overlay (ALEGrO)	90	2020	380 kV DC	50.7530°N 5.6676°E;50.8718°N 6.4529°E

== Czech Republic ==
Facility	Length (km)	Year of inauguration	Voltage	Coordinates of endpoints
Hradec substation, powerline to Etzenricht	?	1993	380 kV	50.3466°N 13.3239°E ; 50.3451°N 13.3317°E

== Denmark ==
Facility	Length (km)	Year of inauguration	Voltage	Coordinates of endpoints
Gistrup – Skudshale	8	?	400 kV	57.0067°N 10.0064°E;56.9896°N 9.8963°E
Little Belt Crossing	12	?	400 kV	55.5351°N 9.6697°E;55.4706°N 9.7902°E
Great Belt power link	58	2010	400 kV DC	55.3669°N 10.5068°E;55.5316°N 11.3152°E
Tørveslettevej – Glentegård Substation	11	?	400 kV	55.7383°N 12.3328°E;55.7522°N 12.4990°E
H. C. Ørsted Power Station – Avedøre Power Station	9	?	400 kV	55.6567°N 12.5560°E;55.6044°N 12.4794°E
Avedøre Power Station – Ishøj Substation	12	?	400 kV	55.6044°N 12.4794°E;55.6324°N 12.3206°E
Bjæverskov Substation – Ishøj Substation	33	2018	220 kV	55.4515°N 12.0061°E;55.6324°N 12.3206°E
Hovegård Substation – Ishøj Substation	17	2019	400 kV	55.7323°N 12.2338°E;55.6324°N 12.3206°E
Anholt Offshore Substation – Trige Substation	83	2013	220 kV	56.5957°N 11.1533°E;56.2743°N 10.1395°E
Horns Rev 3 Offshore Substation – Endrup Substation	79	2016	220 kV	55.6902°N 7.6861°E;55.5308°N 8.7058°E
Kriegers Flak A Offshore Substation – Kriegers Flak B Offshore Substation	9	2020	220 kV	55.0272°N 12.8509°E;55.0485°N 12.9453°E
Kriegers Flak A Offshore Substation – Bjæverskov Substation	76	2020	220 kV	55.0272°N 12.8509°E;55.4515°N 12.0061°E
Kriegers Flak B Offshore Substation – Bjæverskov Substation	79	2020	220 kV	55.0485°N 12.9453°E;55.4515°N 12.0061°E
Sources: OpenInfraMap

== Denmark/Germany ==
Facility	Length (km)	Year of inauguration	Voltage	Coordinates of endpoints
Kontek	171	1995	400 kV DC	55.4515°N 12.0061°E;54.1008°N 12.2161°E
Kriegers Flak B Offshore Substation – Baltic 2 Offshore Substation	24	2021	150-170 kV	55.0485°N 12.9453°E;54.9721°N 13.1617°E

== Denmark/Netherlands ==
Facility	Length (km)	Year of inauguration	Voltage	Coordinates of endpoints
COBRAcable	325	2019	320 kV DC	55.5308°N 8.7058°E;53.4356°N 6.8670°E

== Denmark/Norway ==
Facility	Length (km)	Year of inauguration	Voltage	Coordinates of endpoints
Skagerrak 1 and 2	127	1977	250 kV DC	57.1262°N 9.0663°E;58.1291°N 8.1676°E
Skagerrak 3	127	1993	350 kV DC	57.1262°N 9.0663°E;58.1291°N 8.1676°E
Skagerrak 4	237	2014	500 kV DC	56.4788°N 9.5666°E;58.2597°N 7.8997°E

== Denmark/Sweden ==
Facility	Length (km)	Year of inauguration	Voltage	Coordinates of endpoints
Øresund Crossing Helsingør/Helsingborg	8	?	380 kV	56.0829°N 12.5002°E;56.1324°N 12.5955°E
Konti-Skan 1 (Lyngså-Læsø)	22	1965	285 kV DC	57.2338°N 10.5414°E;57.2524°N 10.9036°E
Konti-Skan 1 (Læsø-Ambjörnhagen)	59	1965	285 kV DC	57.3090°N 11.1265°E;57.5698°N 11.9744°E
Konti-Skan 2 (Lyngså-Læsø)	22	1988	300 kV DC	57.2338°N 10.5414°E;57.2524°N 10.9036°E
Konti-Skan 2 (Læsø-Ambjörnhagen)	59	1988	300 kV DC	57.3090°N 11.1265°E;57.5698°N 11.9744°E

== Egypt/Jordan ==
Facility	Length (km)	Year of inauguration	Voltage	Coordinates of endpoints
Red Sea Cable	13.6	1998	400 kV	29.4863°N 34.8754°E ; 29.4324°N 34.9771°E

== Germany ==
Facility	Length (km)	Year of inauguration	Voltage	Coordinates of endpoints
Berlin/Mitte – Berlin/Stadtautobahn	11,5	1977	380 kV	52.5033°N 13.3691°E; 52.5265°N 13.2809°E
Berlin/Reutter – Berlin/Teufelsbruch	?	1993	380 kV	52.5806°N 13.2116°E ; 52.5316°N 13.2488°E
Berlin/Mitte – Berlin/Friedrichshain	6,3	1998	380 kV	52.5033°N 13.3691°E ; 52.5223°N 13.4571°E
Berlin/Friedrichshain – Berlin/Marzahn	5,2	2000	380 kV	52.5223°N 13.4571°E; 52.5354°N 13.5240°E
Kraftwerk Altbach	0,3	?	380 kV	48.7190°N 9.3708°E; 48.7187°N 9.3745°E
Lübeck/Bargerbück – Lübeck/Siems	?	2004	220 kV	53.9098°N 10.7584°E; 53.9192°N 10.6408°E
SITAC Park Undercrossing	?	?	220 kV	52.4312°N 13.5064°E; 52.4249°N 13.5232°E
Neckarwestheim/Nuclear Power Plant, Unit 2 – Neckarwestheim/Traction Current Inverter Station	?	2011	380 kV	49.0396°N 9.1768°E; 49.0380°N 9.1797°E
Paulaner Brewery Cable Tunnel	?		380 kV	48.1782°N 11.4309°E; 48.1762°N 11.4341°E

== Germany/Norway ==
Facility	Length (km)	Year of inauguration	Voltage	Coordinates of endpoints
NordLink	570	2021	500 kV DC	53.9192°N 9.3443°E;58.2664°N 6.6798°E

== Germany/Sweden ==
Facility	Length (km)	Year of inauguration	Voltage	Coordinates of endpoints
Baltic Cable	250	1994	450 kV DC	53.8961°N 10.8024°E;55.4241°N 13.0621°E

== Morocco/ Spain ==
Facility	Length (km)	Year of inauguration	Voltage	Coordinates of endpoints
Gibraltar Strait Power Cable	?	1998	380 kV	35.8309°N 5.6137°W ; 36.0323°N 5.6061°W

== Italy ==
Facility	Length (km)	Year of inauguration	Voltage	Coordinates of endpoints
Messina Strait Cable	?	1985	380 kV	38.2032°N 15.6379°E ; 38.2286°N 15.5611°E
Milan Section of Turbigo-Rho line	8.5	2006	380 kV	45.5294°N 8.9714°E ; 45.5439°N 9.0568°E

== Italy / Malta ==
Facility	Length (km)	Year of inauguration	Voltage	Coordinates of endpoints
Malta–Sicily interconnector	120	2015	220 kV	36.8809°N 14.6809°E ; 35.9386°N 14.4380°E

== Japan ==
Facility	Length (km)	Year of inauguration	Voltage	Coordinates of endpoints
Shin-Toyosu Line	40	November 2000	500 kV	35.6479°N, 139.7913°E ; 35.7801°N, 140.07131°E

== Luxembourg ==
Facility	Length (km)	Year of inauguration	Voltage	Coordinates of endpoints
Bettembourg West Bypass ( Part of 220 kV-line Schifflange-Berchem)	?	?	220 kV	49.5160°N 6.0899°E ; 49.5331°N 6.1017°E

== Netherlands ==
Facility	Length (km)	Year of inauguration	Voltage	Coordinates of endpoints
Nieuwe Waterweg/Calandkanaal crossing	2.1	2005	380 kV	51.9459°N 4.1526°E;51.9598°N 4.1622°E
North Sea Canal crossing	0.9	2017	380 kV	52.4524°N 4.6707°E;52.4599°N 4.6747°E
Delft – Pijnacker	10.8	2013	380 kV	51.9806°N 4.3334°E;52.0115°N 4.4572°E
Rijpwetering	2	2019	380 kV	52.1795°N 4.5849°E;52.1913°N 4.6039°E
Hoofddorp	3.6	2019	380 kV	52.3052°N 4.6202°E;52.3293°N 4.6554°E
Vijfhuizen – Vijfhuizen Substation	2.9	2019	380 kV	52.3497°N 4.6937°E;52.3737°N 4.6953°E
Sloe Power Plant – Borssele Substation	3.7	2010	380 kV	51.4480°N 3.6924°E;51.4331°N 3.7273°E
Maasstroom Power Plant – Simonshaven Substation	12.4	2011	380 kV	51.8898°N 4.3526°E;51.8394°N 4.2658°E
Enecogen Power Plant – Maasvlakte Substation	12.2	2012	380 kV	51.9581°N 4.0926°E;51.9553°N 4.0222°E
Onyx Power Plant – Maasvlakte Substation	4.8	2016	380 kV	51.9442°N 4.0718°E;51.9553°N 4.0222°E
Maasvlakte Power Plant – Maasvlakte Substation	0.8	2016	380 kV	51.9621°N 4.0204°E;51.9553°N 4.0222°E
Hollandse Kust Zuid Onshore Substation – Maasvlakte Substation	3.7	2021	380 kV	51.9839°N 4.0271°E;51.9553°N 4.0222°E
Gemini Onshore Substation – Eemshaven Oudeschip Substation	1.7	2016	380 kV	53.4439°N 6.8713°E;53.4359°N 6.8625°E
Eemshaven Filter Station – Eemshaven Oudeschip Substation	0.8	2021	380 kV	53.4375°N 6.8686°E;53.4359°N 6.8625°E
COBRA Converter Station – Eemshaven Oudeschip Substation	0.3	2019	380 kV	53.4356°N 6.8673°E;53.4359°N 6.8625°E
NorNed Converter Station – Eemshaven Substation	1.3	2008	380 kV	53.4346°N 6.8664°E;53.4248°N 6.8743°E
Wijk aan Zee Onshore Subtation – Beverwijk Substation	5.5	2023	380 kV	52.4869°N 4.6189°E;52.4728°N 4.6793°E
Gemini I Offshore Subtation – Gemini II Offshore Substation	8.8	2017	220 kV	54.0370°N 6.0416°E;54.0326°N 5.8885°E
Gemini I Offshore Subtation – Gemini Onshore Substation	96	2016	220 kV	54.0370°N 6.0416°E;53.4439°N 6.8713°E
Gemini II Offshore Subtation – Gemini Onshore Substation	103	2016	220 kV	54.0326°N 5.8885°E;53.4439°N 6.8713°E
Borssele Alpha Offshore Substation – Zeeuwse Kust Onshore Substation	61	2019	220 kV	51.7000°N 3.0567°E;51.4315°N 3.7258°E
Borssele Beta Offshore Substation – Zeeuwse Kust Onshore Substation	67	2019	220 kV	51.7262°N 2.9655°E;51.4315°N 3.7258°E
Hollandse Kust Zuid Alpha Offshore Substation – Hollandse Kust Zuid Onshore Substation	42	2021	220 kV	52.3197°N 4.0436°E;51.9839°N 4.0271°E
Hollandse Kust Zuid Beta Offshore Substation – Hollandse Kust Zuid Onshore Substation	34	2022	220 kV	52.2579°N 4.0871°E;51.9839°N 4.0271°E
Hollandse Kust Noord Offshore Substation – Wijk aan Zee Onshore Substation		2023	220 kV	52.6978°N 4.2935°E;52.4869°N 4.6189°E
Hollandse Kust West Alpha Offshore Substation – Wijk aan Zee Onshore Substation		2024 (under construction)	220 kV	52.6804°N 3.8054°E;52.4869°N 4.6189°E
Hollandse Kust West Beta Offshore Substation – Wijk aan Zee Onshore Substation		2025 (under construction)	220 kV	52.6145°N 3.7379°E;52.4869°N 4.6189°E
IJmuiden Ver Alpha Offshore Converter Station – IJmuiden Ver Alpha Onshore Converter Station		planned	525 kV DC	
IJmuiden Ver Alpha Onshore Converter Station – Borssele Substation		planned	380 kV	51.4387°N 3.7236°E;51.4331°N 3.7273°E
IJmuiden Ver Beta Offshore Converter Station – IJmuiden Ver Beta Onshore Converter Station		planned	525 kV DC	
IJmuiden Ver Beta Onschore Converter Station – Maasvlakte Substation		planned	380 kV	51.9484°N 4.0098°E;51.9553°N 4.0222°E
IJmuiden Ver Gamma Offshore Converter Station – IJmuiden Ver Gamma Onshore Converter Station		planned	525 kV DC	
IJmuiden Ver Gamma Onshore Converter Station – Maasvlakte Substation		planned	380 kV	51.9464°N 4.0073°E;51.9553°N 4.0222°E
Sources: TenneT, OpenInfraMap, HoogspanningsNet, Net op zee

== Netherlands/Norway ==
Facility	Length (km)	Year of inauguration	Voltage	Coordinates of endpoints
NorNed	580	2008	450 kV DC	53.4346°N 6.8662°E;58.2826°N 6.8673°E

== New Zealand ==
Facility	Length (km)	Year of inauguration	Voltage	Coordinates of endpoints
Brownhill–Pakuranga link	11	2012	220 kV	36.9736°S 174.9597°E 36.9261°S 174.9063°E
Auckland cross-harbour power cable (Pakuranga–Albany)	37	2014	220 kV	36.9261°S 174.9063°E ; 36.7395°S 174.6907°E

== Norway ==
Facility	Length (km)	Year of inauguration	Voltage	Coordinates of endpoints
Oslofjorden Cable Crossing			420 kV	59.3432°N 10.4790°E ; 59.3654°N 10.6616°E

== Spain ==
Facility	Length (km)	Year of inauguration	Voltage	Coordinates of endpoints
Madrid Barajas Runway Tunnel	13	2003	380 kV	40.5498°N 3.5667°W ; 40.4509°N 3.5213°W

== Switzerland/ Italy ==
Facility	Length (km)	Year of inauguration	Voltage	Coordinates of endpoints
Mendrisio – Cagno Interconnection	8	2008	400	45.8140°N 8.9031°E ; 45.8647°N 8.9717°E

== Turkey ==
Facility	Length (km)	Year of inauguration	Voltage	Coordinates of endpoints
Sutlüce – Lapseki (Dardanelles crossing I)	4.6	2015	400	40.35161°N 26.617991°E ; 40.32560°N 26.65152°E
Sutlüce – Lapseki (Dardanelles crossing II)	4.6	2017	400	40.33481°N 26.599901°E ; 40.31766°N 26.64238°E

== United Kingdom ==
Facility	Length (km)	Year of inauguration	Voltage	Coordinates of endpoints
Beatrice Wind Farm, Moray Firth – Blackhillock substation, Moray	70	2007, 2018	220 kV	58°7′48″N 3°4′12″W ; 57.4984°N 2.9883°W
Bicester, East Claydon – Bicester substations, Oxfordshire			132 kV	51.92663°N 0.90307°W
Bradford, Bradford West – Kirkstall substations (line partly underground) Yorkshire			275 kV	53.82822°N 1.77895°W
Brechfa Forest West onshore wind farm, Carmarthenshire		2018	132 kV	51°59′00″N 04°09′50″W
Burbo Bank offshore wind farm, Liverpool Bay – onshore substation, Denbighshire		2008, 2017	220 kV	53.48°N 3.26°W ; 53.26038°N 3.50465°W
Caithness–Moray Transmission link, Spittal, Caithness, Scotland – Blackhillock, Moray, Scotland	113	2019	320 kV	58.4485°N 3.4376°W ; 57.4984°N 2.9883°W
Dinorwig power station – Pentir, Gwynedd		1984	400 kV	53° 7′ 7″ N, 4° 6′ 50″ W ; 53.1723°N 4.1694°W
Dorset Area of Outstanding Natural Beauty	9	2022	400kV	50.660°N 2.511°W ; 50.705°N 2.536°W
Dudgeon offshore wind farm – Necton substation, Norfolk		2017	132kV	53.249°N 1.39°E ; 52.65838°N 0.80156°E
East Anglia one offshore wind farm – Bramford substation, Suffolk	>43	2020	220 kV	52°54′28″N 2°37′43″E ; 52.07049°N 1.06118°E
Edinburgh, Gardners Crescent – Dewar Place Substation, Edinburgh	0.2	2010	275 kV	55.92991°N 3.18669°W
Fawley Tunnel (Fawley – Chilling), Hampshire	3.2	1966	400 kV	50.826°N 1.314°W
Fawley – Langley, Hampshire			132 kV	50.81551°N 1.34029°W
Greater Gabbard and Galloper Array offshore wind farms – Sizewell, Suffolk	>23	2012 and 2018	132 kV	51.8052°N 1.7855°E ; 52.215°N 1.61972°E
Gunfleet sands offshore wind farm, Clacton, Essex		2010	132kV	51°44′22″N 1°10′28″E ; 51.7945°N 1.2543°E
Gwynt y Môr offshore wind farm – Bodelwyddan substation, Denbighshire	>18	2015	132 kV	53°27′N 3°35′W ; 53.26038°N 3.50465°W
Hornsea offshore wind farm – Killingholme, North East Lincolnshire		2019	220 kV	53.885°N 1.791°E ; 53.64225°N 0.26928°E
Hull, Creyke Bank – Hull South substations, Hull			132 kV	53.79994°N 0.41269°W
Hull, Sculcoates B – Cornwall Street substation, Hull			132 kV	53.76075°N 0.33407°W
Hull, Salt End substation – Hull East substation, Hull			132 kV	53.74236°N 0.23795°W
HVDC Kingsnorth (Kingsnorth, Kent – Beddington – Willesden, London)	59 km + 26 km	1974 (decommissioned 1986)	± 266 kV	51.418947°N 0.602702°E ; 51.4011°N 0.1388°W
Isle of Wight submarine cables (Langley, Hampshire – Cowes & East Wooton, Isle of Wight)			132 kV	50.80967°N 1.35447°W ; 50.711304°N 1.254048°W
Kentish Flats offshore wind farm, Kent		2005	33 kV	51°27′36″N 1°5′24″E ; 51.3548°N 1.08534°E
Laleham, Surrey – Ealing – Willesden, West London			275 kV	51.4236°N 0.47021°W ; 51.5008°N 0.29402°W ; 51.53354°N 0.2553°W
Liverpool, Kirkby –Lister Drive City, Merseyside	10	2007	400 kV	53.46966°N 2.84288°W
London Array offshore wind farm – Cleve Hill, Kent		2013	150 kV	51°38′N 1°29′E ; 51.3315°N 0.9303°E
London, St John's Wood – City Road			400 kV	51.52666°N 0.16488°W ; 51.52832°N 0.09124°W
London, City Road – West Ham			400 kV	51.52832°N 0.09124°W ; 51.518684°N 0.002197°E
London, Beddington Cable Tunnel,(Beddington – Rowdown)			400 kV	51.36594°N 0.12324°W ; 51.34789°N 0.00954°W
London, Hertfordshire, Elstree to St. John's Wood Deep Cable Tunnel	20	2005	400 kV	51.52666°N 0.16488°W ; 51.65512°N 0.32714°W
London, West Ham – Hackney (Lower Lea Valley Cable Tunnel)	6.3	2008	400 kV	51.518684°N 0.002197°E ; 51.56108°N 0.05404°W
London, London Power Tunnels, (Hackney – St. John's Wood)	12.5	2018	400 kV	51.56108°N 0.05404°W ; 51.53599°N 0.23703°W
London, London Power Tunnels (St. John's Wood – Kensal Green – Willesden)	7.4	2018	400 kV	51.52666°N 0.16488°W ; 51.53599°N 0.23703°W
London, London Power Tunnels (Kensal Green – Wimbledon)	12.1	2018	400 kV	51.52636°N 0.22584°W ; 51.42784°N 0.18237°W
London, Wimbledon – New Cross	12	2025 (under construction)	400 kV	51.42784°N 0.18237°W ; 51.48082°N 0.06239°W
London, New Cross – Hurst	18	2026 (under construction)	400 kV	51.48082°N 0.06239°W ; 51.43236°N 0.1541°E
London, Hurst – Crayford	2.5	2024 (under construction)	400 kV	51.43236°N 0.1541°E ; 51.44775°N 0.17925°E
London, St. John's Wood – Tottenham substations			275 kV	51.527499°N 0.169376°W ; 51.603178°N 0.048243°W
London, Tottenham – Redbridge substations			275 kV	51.603178°N 0.048243°W ; 51.588552°N 0.044926°E
Lynn and Inner Dowsing offshore wind farms, Lincolnshire – Walpole substation, Norfolk		2009	132 kV	53°07′39″N 00°26′10″E ; 52.73139°N 0.2281°E
Moyle Interconnector (Auchencrosh, Dumfries and Galloway – Ballycronan More, County Antrim, Northern Ireland)	63.5	2001	275 kV DC	55.07313°N 4.98188°W ; 54.83746°N 5.7806°W
Orrmonde offshore wind farm – Heysham, Lancashire		2012	132 kV	54°6′N 3°24′W ; 54.0331°N 2.87913°W
Race Bank offshore wind farm – Walpole substation, Norfolk		2018	250 kV	53.276°N 0.841°E ; 52.73139°N 0.2281°E
Rampion offshore wind farm – Bolney, Sussex		2018	150 kV	50°40′0″N 0°16′0″W ; 50.97535°N 0.22574°W
Redcar, Lackenby –Thornton, part buried, Redcar and Cleveland			400 kV	54.5157°N 1.169°W
River Medway Cable Tunnels (Grain – Chetney Marsh), Kent	1.7	1977	400 kV	51°25'14.6"N 0°41'59.6"E ; 51°26'09.0"N 0°42'18.9"E
Severn-Wye Cable Tunnel (Aust – Newhouse)	3.6	1973	400 kV	51.608459°N 2.615454°W ; 51.610878°N 2.669090°W
Sheffield, Neepsend – Pitsmoor and Sheffield City substations, South Yorkshire			275 kV	53.4026°N 1.48569°W
Sheringhan Shoal offshore wind farm, Norfolk – substation, Norfolk		2012	132 kV	53.135°N 1.147°E ; 52.76802°N 1.13913°E
Thanet offshore wind farm – Richborough, Kent		2010	132 kV	51.4306°N 1.6331°E ; 51.3101°N 1.35278°E
Walney and West of Duddon Sands offshore wind farms – Heysham Lancashire		2011, 2014, 2018	220 kV	54.044°N 3.522°W and 53.983°N 3.463°W ; 54.0331°N 2.87913°W
Western HVDC Link (Hunterston – Connah's Quay)	422	2018	600 kV DC	55°43′20″N 4°53′24″W ; 53.232162°N 3.0813°W
Woodhead tunnel, South Yorkshire	4.888	1969	400 kV	53.495659°N 1.829765°W ; 53.517377°N 1.765451°W
River Thames	For crossings under the Thames see Powerline river crossings in the United Kingdom			

=== UK – Europe ===
UK high voltage submarine connections to/from other countries
Facility	Length (km)	Year of inauguration	Voltage	Coordinates of endpoints
BritNed (Isle of Grain, Kent – Maasvlakte, Netherlands)	260	2011	±450 kV DC	51°26′24″N 0°43′0″E ; 51.96127°N 4.01617°E
East–West Interconnector (Shotton, Flintshire, Wales – Rush North Beach, County Dublin, Republic of Ireland)	263	2012	±200 kV DC	53°13′38″N 3°4′22″W ; 53°28′16″N 6°34′3″W
HVDC Cross-Channel (Sellinge, Kent – Poste électrique des Mandarins, France)	73	1986	±270 kV DC	51.10452°N 0.98393°E ; 50.90776°N 1.72806°E
IFA-2 Interconnexion France-Angleterre (Fareham, Hampshire – Tourbe, France)	204	Under construction	±320 kV DC	50.8217°N 1.18448°W ; 49.1139°N 0.2324°W
Isle of Man to England Interconnector (Bispham, Blackpool – Douglas Head, Isle of Man)	104	2000	90 kV AC	53°50′57″N 03°01′46″W ; 54°08′52″N 4°28′51″W
Nemo Link (Richborough, Kent – Nemo Link Converter Station, Belgium)	141.5	2019	400 kV DC	51.309239°N 1.344376°E ; 51.25245°N 3.17864°E
North Sea Link (Blyth, Northumberland – Kvilldal, Norway)	730	2021 (Under testing phase)	±515 kV DC	55.14364°N 1.54245°W ; 59.4965°N 6.6984°E
Viking Link (Bicker Fen, Lincolnshire – Revsing, Denmark)	740	2023 (Under construction)	±525 kV DC	55.523056°N 8.709722°E ; 52.930278°N 0.220556°W

== Canada ==
Facility	Length (km)	Year of inauguration	Voltage	Coordinates of endpoints
Trincomali Channel, AC-Cable	?	?	280 kV	48.8794°N 123.4027°W ; 48.8632°N 123.4525°W
Galiano Island-Canadian Mainland, AC-Cable	?	?	280 kV	48.9186°N 123.4040°W ; ?
Malaspina Strait Cable	?	?	500 kV	49.6741°N 124.2035°W ; 49.6301°N 124.2842°W
Texada Island-Vancouver Island Cable	?	?	500 kV	49.5903°N 124.3582°W ; 49.4217°N 124.6431°W

== United States of America ==
Facility	Length (km)	Year of inauguration	Voltage	Coordinates of endpoints
Tehachapi Renewable Transmission Project	5.6 km buried of 278 km total	2016	500 kV	Kern County, CA to Los Angeles and San Bernardino Counties. Undergrounded portion in Chino Hills, CA
