= High-voltage substations in the United Kingdom =

The high-voltage (400 kV and 275 kV) electricity substations in the United Kingdom are listed in the following tables. The substations provide entry points to, and exit points from, the National Grid (GB) or Northern Ireland Electricity Network. Entry points include power stations, major wind farms and inter-connectors from other countries and regions. Exit points are to lower voltage (275 kV, 132 kV, 66 kV and 33 kV) transmission and distribution substations which are also shown in the tables.

== History ==
The first high-voltage substations in Britain were built as part of the National Grid in 1927–1933 by the Central Electricity Board under the provisions of the Electricity (Supply) Act 1926. The substations and the grid operated at 132 kV and provided local and regional inter-connections. Higher voltage substations were built as part of the super-grid designed for the bulk transfer of electricity which began to operate from 1953, firstly at 275 kV then from 1965 additionally at 400 kV. The first 400 kV line was the 150 mile section between West Burton power station in Nottinghamshire and Sundon substation in Bedfordshire; the line had a capacity of 1,800 MVA per circuit. The first 400 kV substations in Scotland were commissioned in 1972 associated with the line from Hunterston, Ayrshire to Neilston, Renfrewshire.

From 1958 the super-grid and its substations were built by the Transmission Project Group within the Central Electricity Generating Board and included architects and landscape architects. The 400 kV super-grid reduced the number of lines and substations and therefore the number of amenity objections. Some substations in urban areas were installed in enclosed structures but the majority were in the open. The appearance of substations, and their visual impact, was improved using earth mounds and trees. Between 1968 and 1973, 725,000 tall trees, 915,400 smaller trees and 17,600 ground cover plants had been used to screen substations. The substation at Sundon, Bedfordshire adjacent to the M1 motorway was screened with a beech hedge, and at Bishop's Wood in Worcestershire the substation was built within an existing wood. In 1972 a Mark II low profile 400 kV substation was commissioned, the first was at Wymondley, Hertfordshire. The substation used lighter support structures and the height was reduced from 72 ft to 53 ft (21.9 m to 16.1 m).

The rapid development of the 400 kV system is demonstrated in the numbers of new substations that were being built: in 1971 ten 400 kV substations were commissioned by the CEGB, these were: Pheasant Farm, Abham, Didcot, Exeter, Hinkley Point, Indian Queens, Landulph, Melksham, Drax and Harker. By 1973 there were sixty-one 400 kV substations. In 1979 there were a total of 201 (275 kV and 400 kV) substations. By the time of privatisation of the British electricity industry in 1990 there were 212 substations operating at 275 kV and 400 kV, and a total of 4,069 circuit km (2,528 miles) operating at 275 kV, and 9,822 circuit km (6,103 miles) circuit at 400 kV. In 2020 there were 179 400 kV substations and 137 275 kV substations.

Centralised co-ordination of electricity supplies in Northern Ireland began with the establishment of the Electricity Board for Northern Ireland in 1931. The Northern Ireland Electricity Service was established on 1 April 1973 by the Electricity Supply (Northern Ireland) Order 1972. The integrated electricity network was built in the late 1960s and early 1970s. In 1979, the system comprised 323 route km (201 miles) of 275 kV lines, 836 route km (519 miles) of 110 kV line, and 38,875 route km (24,156 miles) of distribution mains.

== Owners and operators ==
The 275/400 kV grid and substations in England and Wales are owned and operated by National Grid Electricity Transmission. It also operates the grid and substations in Scotland although the systems are owned by ScottishPower and Scottish & Southern Energy. In Northern Ireland grid and substations are owned and operated by Northern Ireland Electricity Networks Limited (NIE Networks).

== England and Wales ==
=== 400 kV substations ===
The 400 kV substations in England and Wales and their interconnections are given in the following table. The identification codes (e.g. 4YF) for the interconnecting lines and the lower voltage transmission, if any, from the substation are also given.

England and Wales 400 kV substations
Substation name	Location county/unitary authority	Connection to other 400 kV substations:	Remarks	Lower voltage transmission from substation
Abham	Devon	Exeter	Code 4YF	
Abham	Devon	Landulph		
Alverdiscott	Devon	Taunton		
Alverdiscott	Devon	Indian Queens		
Amersham Main	Buckinghamshire	Iver		132 kV
Amersham Main	Buckinghamshire	East Claydon		132 kV
Aust	South Gloucestershire	Melksham	Cable sealing end compound for underground Severn-Wye cable tunnel	
Aust	South Gloucestershire	Newhouse		
Axminster	Devon	Exeter	Code 4YA	
Axminster	Devon	Chickerell		
Barking	Greater London	West Ham		275 kV, 132 kV, 33 kV
Barking	Greater London	West Thurrock		275 kV, 132 kV, 33 kV
Barking	Greater London	Tilbury	Code YYJ	275 kV, 132 kV, 33 kV
Beddington	Greater London	Rowdown	Beddington Cable Tunnel Code ZZT	275 kV, 132 kV
Beddington	Greater London	Kingsnorth	Former ±266 kV HVDC Kingsnorth circuit (operational 1974–86)	
Beddington	Greater London	Willesden	Former ±266 kV HVDC Kingsnorth circuit (operational 1974–86)	
Bicker Fen	Lincolnshire	On Walpole–West Burton circuits		132 kV
Blyth	Northumberland	Link to Stella West–Eccles circuits		
Blyth	Northumberland	North Sea Link HVDC converter station	HVDC link to Norway	
Bodelwyddan	Denbighshire	Feed from Burbo Bank wind farm		
Bodelwyddan	Denbighshire	Link to Connahs Quay–Pentir circuits		
Bolney	West Sussex	Ninfield	Code 4VM Also feed from Rampion wind farm	132 kV, 33 kV
Bolney	West Sussex	Lovedean	Code 4VF	132 kV, 33 kV
Botley Wood	Hampshire	Lovedean	Code 4YE	
Botley Wood	Hampshire	Chilling	Code 4YE	
Bradford West	West Yorkshire	Eggborough		275 kV, 132 kV
Bradford West	West Yorkshire	Elland		275 kV, 132 kV
Bradford West	West Yorkshire	Lower Shelf		275 kV, 132 kV
Braintree	Essex	Rayleigh Main		132 kV, 33 kV
Braintree	Essex	Twinstead Tee		132 kV, 33 kV
Bramford	Suffolk	Stocking Pelham		132 kV
Bramford	Suffolk	Norwich Main	Code 4YM	132 kV
Bramford	Suffolk	Sizewell	4 circuits	132 kV
Bramford	Suffolk	East Anglia ONE	220 kV feed from East Anglia ONE windfarm	132 kV
Bramley	Hampshire	Fleet		132 kV
Bramley	Hampshire	West Weybridge	Code ZH	132 kV
Bramley	Hampshire	Melksham	Code YYM	132 kV
Bramley	Hampshire	Didcot		132 kV
Bredbury	Greater Manchester	Macclesfield		
Bredbury	Greater Manchester	South Manchester		
Bridgwater	Somerset		Under construction (2020)	
Brinsworth	South Yorkshire	Thorpe Marsh		275 kV
Britned	Kent	Grain		
Bull's Lodge	Essex	On Rayleigh Main–Braintree circuits		
Burwell Main	Cambridgeshire	Pelham		132 kV
Burwell Main	Cambridgeshire	Walpole		132 kV
Bustleholm	West Midlands	Substation		
Bustleholm	West Midlands	Link to Hams Hall–Draklow circuits		
Canterbury North	Kent	Kemsley	Code ZV	
Canterbury North	Kent	Richborough		
Canterbury North	Kent	Sellindge	Code ZY	
Capenhurst	Cheshire West and Chester	Connahs Quay		
Carrington	Greater Manchester	Daines		
Carrington	Greater Manchester	South Manchester		
Carrington	Greater Manchester	Kearsley		
Cellarhead	Staffordshire	Drakelow	Code ZE	
Cellarhead	Staffordshire	Macclesfield		
Chafford Hundred	Essex			
Chickerell	Dorset	Mannington	Code 4VN	
Chickerell	Dorset	Axminster		
Chilling	Hampshire	Botley Wood	Code 4YE	
Chilling	Hampshire	Fawley		
Cilfynydd	Rhondda	Imperial Park		275 kV
Cilfynydd	Rhondda	Swansea North		275 kV
Cilfynydd	Rhondda	Seabank		275 kV
Cilfynydd	Rhondda	Rassau–Rhigos circuit		275 kV
City Road	Greater London	St. John's Wood	Underground along Regent's Canal	132 kV, 33 kV
City Road	Greater London	West Ham	Underground along Lea Navigation, Hertford Union and Regent's Canals	132 kV, 33 kV
Cleve Hill	Kent	On Kemsley–Canterbury North circuits	Feed from London Array	
Connahs Quay	Flintshire (Sir y Fflint)	Capenhurst		
Connahs Quay	Flintshire (Sir y Fflint)	Daines		
Connahs Quay	Flintshire (Sir y Fflint)	Flintshire Bridge Converter	Western HVDC Link	
Connahs Quay	Flintshire (Sir y Fflint)	Treuddyn		
Connahs Quay	Flintshire (Sir y Fflint)	Pentir		
Coryton South	Essex	Spur on Tilbury–Rayleigh Main circuits		
Cottam	Nottinghamshire	West Burton	400 kV link to Cottam Development Centre	
Cottam	Nottinghamshire	Wymondley	400 kV link to Cottam Development Centre	
Cottam	Nottinghamshire	High Marnham	400 kV link to Cottam Development Centre	
Cowley	Oxfordshire	Didcot		132 kV, 33 kV
Cowley	Oxfordshire	Seven Springs	Code 4TE	132 kV, 33 kV
Cowley	Oxfordshire	East Claydon		132 kV, 33 kV
Crayford	Greater London	Hurst	Under construction	
Creyke Beck	East Yorkshire	Thornton		
Creyke Beck	East Yorkshire	Keadby		
Culham JET	Oxfordshire	Spur on Didcot–Cowley circuits		
Daines	Greater Manchester	Connahs Quay		
Daines	Greater Manchester	Carrington		
Daines	Greater Manchester	South Manchester		
Daines	Greater Manchester	Macclesfield		
Damhead Creek	Kent	Kingsnorth		
Deeside power station	Cheshire West	Connahs Quay		
Didcot	Oxfordshire	Bramley	Code 4YG	132 kV, 33 kV
Didcot	Oxfordshire	Cowley		132 kV, 33 kV
Dinorwig	Gwynedd	Pentir	Underground	
Dinorwig	Gwynedd	Tee on Pentir-Trawsfynydd circuits	Underground	
Drakelow	Derbyshire	Cellarhead	Code ZE	
Drakelow	Derbyshire	Penn	Code ZN	
Drakelow	Derbyshire	Hams Hall		
Drakelow	Derbyshire	Ratcliffe		
Drax	North Yorkshire	Thornton	Code 4VC	
Drax	North Yorkshire	Eggborough	Code 4VJ	
Drax	North Yorkshire	Fenwick Tee	Code 4VH	
Dungeness	Kent	Sellindge	Code 4VO	275 kV
Dungeness	Kent	Ninfield	Code 4ZJ	275 kV
East Claydon	Buckinghamshire	Cowley		132 kV
East Claydon	Buckinghamshire	Amersham		132 kV
East Claydon	Buckinghamshire	Sundon		132 kV
East Claydon	Buckinghamshire	Enderby		132 kV
Eaton Socon	Cambridgeshire	On Wymondley–Cottam circuits		132 kV
Eccles (Scotland)	Borders	Stella West		
Eccleshill	West Yorkshire	Padiham		
Eccleshill	West Yorkshire	Penwortham	Code ZO	
Eccleshill	West Yorkshire	Kearsley		
Eggborough	North Yorkshire	Drax	Code 4VJ	
Eggborough	North Yorkshire	To trans-Pennine (Woodhead) circuits		
Eggborough	North Yorkshire	Monk Fryston		
Elland	West Yorkshire	Bradford West		
Elland	West Yorkshire	Link to Ferrybridge–Rochdale circuits		
Elstree	Hertfordshire	St John's Wood	Elstree to St. John's Wood Deep Cable Tunnel	275 kV, 132 kV
Elstree	Hertfordshire	Sundon		275 kV, 132 kV
Enderby	Leicestershire	East Claydon		
Enderby	Leicestershire	Ratcliffe		
Exeter	Devon	Taunton	Code ZZ	
Fawley	Hampshire	Nursling	Code 4YD	
Fawley	Hampshire	Mannington		
Feckenham	Worcestershire	Seven Springs		132 kV
Feckenham	Worcestershire	Hams Hall		132 kV
Feckenham	Worcestershire	Penn		132 kV
Fenwick Tee	North Yorkshire	Connection to Drax on the Thorpe Marsh to Keadby circuit		
Ferrybridge	North Yorkshire	Drax		
Ferrybridge	North Yorkshire	Rochdale		
Fleet	Hampshire	Lovedean		132 kV, 33 kV
Fleet	Hampshire	Bramley		132 kV, 33 kV
Flintshire Bridge Converter	Flintshire	Connahs Quay		
Frodsham	Halton	Rocksavage power station		
Frodsham	Halton	Capenhurst		
Grain	Kent	Kingsnorth	Code 4YN	
Grain	Kent	Kemsley	Code 4TL, includes River Medway Cable Tunnel	
Grain	Kent	Grain CHP		
Grain	Kent	Medway power station		
Grain	Kent	Grain Static Inverter Plant BritNed	450 kV DC	
Grain CHP	Kent	Grain		
Grain Static Inverter	Kent	Grain		
Grendon	Northamptonshire	Sundon		132 kV
Grendon	Northamptonshire	Staythorpe		132 kV
Grimsby West	North East Lincolnshire	Keadby	Feed from South Humber Bank, Killingholme B and Immingham power stations to Keadby–Grimsby West circuits	
Hackney	Greater London	Seven Sisters Road	London Power Tunnels	275 kV, 132 kV, 66 kV
Hackney	Greater London	West Ham	Lower Lea Valley Cable Tunnel	275 kV, 132 kV, 66 kV
Hackney	Greater London	St. John's Wood	London Power Tunnel, single circuit	275 kV, 132 kV, 66 kV
Hambleton Tee	Lancashire	Heysham		
Hambleton Tee	Lancashire	Penwortham		
Hambleton Tee	Lancashire	Stanah		
Hams Hall	Warwickshire	Feckenham		275 kV, 132 kV
Hams Hall	Warwickshire	Ratcliffe		275 kV, 132 kV
Hams Hall	Warwickshire	Drakelow		275 kV, 132 kV
Harker	Cumbria	Hutton		
Harker	Cumbria	Gretna (Scotland)		
Hawthorn Pit	Durham	Norton	Code 4TF	
Heysham	Lancashire	Stanah (via Hambleton Tee)		
Heysham	Lancashire	Quernmore		
Highbury	Greater London	Spur Seven Sisters Road–St. John's Wood circuit	Underground line	11 kV
High Marnham	Nottinghamshire	Cottam		
High Marnham	Nottinghamshire	Staythorpe		
Hinckley Point	Somerset	Melksham		
Humber Refinery	North Lincolnshire	Immingham power station		
Hurst	Greater London	New Cross	Under construction	275 kV, 132 kV
Hurst	Greater London	Crayford	Under construction	275 kV, 132 kV
Hutton	Cumbria	Harker		
Hutton	Cumbria	Quernmore		
Imperial Park	Newport	Melksham		
Imperial Park	Newport	Cilfynydd		
Indian Queens	Cornwall	Landulph		
Indian Queens	Cornwall	Alverdiscott		
Ironbridge	Telford and Wrekin	Penn		
Ironbridge	Telford and Wrekin	Drakelow–Penn circuits		
Ironbridge	Telford and Wrekin	Shrewsbury		
Iver	Buckinghamshire	Amersham		275 kV, 132 kV
Keadby	North Lincolnshire	West Burton		132 kV
Keadby	North Lincolnshire	Grimsby West		132 kV
Keadby	North Lincolnshire	Thorpe Marsh		132 kV
Kearsley	Greater Manchester	Carrington		
Kearsley	Greater Manchester	Penwortham		
Kemsley	Kent	Grain	Code 4TL, includes River Medway Cable Tunnel	132 kV, 33 kV
Kemsley	Kent	Northfleet West	Code TP	132 kV, 33 kV
Kemsley	Kent	Canterbury North	Code ZV	132 kV, 33 kV
Kensal Green	Greater London	St. John's Wood	Underground, along Regent's Canal and Grand Union Canal	
Kensal Green	Greater London	Willesden	Underground, along Grand Union Canal	
Kensal Green	Greater London	Wimbledon	London Power Tunnels, single circuit	
Killingholme	North Lincolnshire	On Keadby–Grimsby circuits		
Kingsnorth	Kent	Northfleet East	Code 4YN	
Kingsnorth	Kent	Tilbury	Code 4VG	
Kingsnorth	Kent	Grain	Code 4TK	
Kingsnorth	Kent	Feed from Damhead Creek		
Kingsnorth	Kent	Beddington	Former ±266 kV HVDC Kingsnorth circuit (operational 1974–86)	
Lackenby	Redcar and Cleveland	Thornton		275 kV, 66 kV
Landulph	Cornwall	Indian Queens		
Landulph	Cornwall	Abham		
Langage power station	Devon	Abham–Landulph circuit		
Legacy	Wrexham	Shrewsbury		132 kV, 33 kV
Legacy	Wrexham	Treuddyn		132 kV, 33 kV
Leighton Buzzard	Bedfordshire	On East Claydon–Sundon circuits		
Little Barford	Bedfordshire	On Wymondley–Cottam circuits		
Littlebrook	Kent	Northfleet West		275 kV, 132 kV
Littlebrook	Kent	West Thurrock	Dartford Cable Tunnel	275 kV, 132 kV
Longfield	Kent	?		
Lovedean	Hampshire	Bolney	Code 4VF	132 kV
Lovedean	Hampshire	Fleet	Code VB	132 kV
Lovedean	Hampshire	Nursling	Code 4YC	132 kV
Lovedean	Hampshire	Botley Wood	Code 4YE	132 kV
Lower Shelf	Blackburn with Darwen	Padiham		
Lower Shelf	Blackburn with Darwen	Bradford West		
Lower Shelf	Blackburn with Darwen	Monk Fryston		
Macclesfield	Cheshire	Cellarhead	Code YV?	
Macclesfield	Cheshire	Daines		
Macclesfield	Cheshire	Stalybridge		
Mannington	Dorset	Chickerell	Code 4VN	
Mannington	Dorset	Nursling		
Marchwood	Hampshire	On Fawley–Nursling circuits		
Medway power station	Kent	Grain		
Melksham	Wiltshire	Hinkley Point	Code ZG	
Melksham	Wiltshire	Bramley	Code YYM	
Melksham	Wiltshire	Minety		
Melksham	Wiltshire	Imperial Park		
Melksham	Wiltshire	Seabank		
Melksham	Wiltshire	400 kV feed to Whitson		
Middleton	Lancashire	Heysham		
Middleton	Lancashire	Link on Penwortham–Hutton circuit		
Minety	Wiltshire	Seven Springs		132 kV
Minety	Wiltshire	Melksham		132 kV
Monk Fryston	North Yorkshire	Eggborough		275 kV
Monk Fryston	North Yorkshire	Lower Shelf		275 kV
Necton	Norfolk	On Norwich Main–Walpole circuits		132 kV
Neepsend	Sheffield	Hunshelf		
New Cross	Greater London	Wimbledon	Under construction	275 kV, 132 kV, 66 kV
New Cross	Greater London	Hurst	Under construction	275 kV, 132 kV, 66 kV
Newhouse	Monmouthshire	Aust/Whitson	Cable sealing end compound for underground Severn crossing	
Ninfield	East Sussex	Dungeness	Code 4ZJ	132 kV, 33 kV
Ninfield	East Sussex	Bolney	Code 4VM	132 kV, 33 kV
Northfleet East	Kent	Northfleet West		132 kV
Northfleet East	Kent	West Thurrock	Includes overhead Thames Crossing	132 kV
Northfleet East	Kent	Singlewell	Code 4YN	132 kV
Northfleet West	Kent	Rowdown		132 kV, 33 kV
Northfleet West	Kent	Northfleet East		132 kV, 33 kV
Northfleet West	Kent	Littlebrook		132 kV, 33 kV
Northfleet West	Kent	Kemsley	Code TP	132 kV, 33 kV
North Sea Link HVDC converter station	Northumberland	Blyth	HVDC link to Norway	
Norton	Stockton on Tees	Hawthorn Pit	Code 4TF	
Norton	Stockton on Tees	Spennymoor	Code ZXC	
Norton	Stockton on Tees	Teesside high voltage users		
Norton	Stockton on Tees	Osbaldwick		
Norwich Main	Norfolk	Bramford	Code 4YM	132 kV
Norwich Main	Norfolk	Walpole	Code 4VV	132 kV
Nursling	Hampshire	Fawley		
Nursling	Hampshire	Lovedean	Code 4YC	
Nursling	Hampshire	Mannington		
Oldbury	West Midlands	Drakelow		
Oldbury	West Midlands	275 kV substation		
Osbaldwick	York	Norton		132 kV
Osbaldwick	York	Thornton		132 kV
Padiham	Lancashire	Lower Shelf		132 kV
Padiham	Lancashire	Eccleshill		132 kV
Patford Bridge	Northamptonshire	On East Claydon–Enderby circuit		
Pembroke	Pembrokeshire	Swansea North		132 kV
Penn	West Midlands	Feckenham		132 kV
Penn	West Midlands	Ironbridge		132 kV
Penn	West Midlands	Drakelow	Code ZN	132 kV
Pentir	Gwynedd	Trawsfynydd	Code 4ZC	
Pentir	Gwynedd	Dinorwig		
Pentir	Gwynedd	Connahs Quay		
Pentir	Gwynedd	Wylfa		
Penwortham	Lancashire	Kearsley		
Penwortham	Lancashire	Stanah (via Hambleton Tee)		
Penwortham	Lancashire	Quernmore		
Penwortham	Lancashire	Eccleshill	Code ZO	
Pudding Mill Lane	Greater London	Spur from West Ham–City Road line	Underground cable, main traction current supply to Elizabeth line, back up supply at Kensal Green/Westbourne Park	25 kV
Quernmore	Lancashire	Hutton	Code ZX	
Quernmore	Lancashire	Heysham		
Quernmore	Lancashire	Penwortham		
Rassau	Blaenau Gwent	Rhigos		132 kV
Rassau	Blaenau Gwent	Walham		132 kV
Ratcliffe	Leicestershire	Staythorpe		132 kV
Ratcliffe	Leicestershire	Enderby		132 kV
Ratcliffe	Leicestershire	Coventry		132 kV
Ratcliffe	Leicestershire	Drakelow		132 kV
Ratcliffe	Leicestershire	Willington		132 kV
Rayleigh Main	Essex	Tilbury		132 kV
Rayleigh Main	Essex	Braintree	Code 4VB	132 kV
Rhigos	Rhondda	Swansea North		
Rhigos	Rhondda	Rassau		
Richborough	Kent	Canterbury North	Code ZID, feed to/from NEMO	132 kV, 33 kV
Rochdale	Lancashire	Ferrybridge		132 kV
Rochdale	Lancashire	Whitegate		132 kV
Rocksavage	Halton	Frodsham		
Rowdown	Greater London	Beddington	Beddington Cable Tunnel Code ZZT	
Rowdown	Greater London	Northfleet West		
Rugeley	Staffordshire	On Penn–Drakelow circuits		
Rye House	Hertfordshire	Stocking Pelham		132 kV
Rye House	Hertfordshire	Waltham Cross		132 kV
St. John's Wood	Greater London	Kensal Green	Underground, along Regent's Canal and Grand Union Canal	275 kV, 132 kV, 66 kV, 22 kV
St. John's Wood	Greater London	City Road	Underground along Regent's Canal	275 kV, 132 kV, 66 kV, 22 kV
St. John's Wood	Greater London	Hackney	London Power Tunnel, single circuit	275 kV, 132 kV, 66 kV, 22 kV
St. John's Wood	Greater London	Elstree	Elstree to St. John's Wood Deep Cable Tunnel	275 kV, 132 kV, 66 kV, 22 kV
Sandford	North Somerset		Under construction (2020)	
Seabank	Bristol	Cilfynydd		
Seabank	Bristol	Melksham		
Sellindge	Kent	Canterbury North		132 kV
Sellindge	Kent	Dungeness	Code 4VO	132 kV
Sellindge	Kent	Feed to/from France	270 kV DC	132 kV
Seven Sisters Road	Greater London	On Hackney–St John's Wood circuits		
Seven Springs	Gloucestershire	Cowley		
Seven Springs	Gloucestershire	Minety		
Seven Springs	Gloucestershire	Walham		
Seven Springs	Gloucestershire	Feckenham	Code ZF	
Shotton Converter Station	Flintshire	Deeside power station		
Shotton Converter Station	Flintshire	Woodland Conversion Station (Ireland)	400 kV DC East–West Interconnecter to Republic of Ireland, operated by EirGrid	
Shrewsbury	Shropshire	Ironbridge		132 kV, 33 kV
Shrewsbury	Shropshire	Legacy		132 kV, 33 kV
Singlewell feeder	Kent	Spur on Northfleet East–Kingsnorth circuits (Code 4YN)	Traction current supply to High Speed 1	25 kV
Sizewell	Suffolk	Bramford	4 circuits	
South Humber Bank power station	North Lincolnshire	On Keadby–Grimsby West circuits		
South Manchester	Greater Manchester	Daines		
South Manchester	Greater Manchester	Carrington		
South Manchester	Greater Manchester	Bredbury		
Spalding	Lincolnshire	On Walpole–West Burton circuits		
Spennymoor	Durham	Stella West	Code 4TQ	
Spennymoor	Durham	Norton	Code ZXC	
Stanah	Lancashire	Penwortham (via Hambleton Tee)		
Stanah	Lancashire	Heysham		
Stalybridge	Greater Manchester	Thorpe Marsh	Code 4ZO Trans-Pennine via Woodhead tunnel	275 kV
Stalybridge	Greater Manchester	Stocksbridge	Code 4ZO Trans-Pennine via Woodhead tunnel	275 kV
Stalybridge	Greater Manchester	Macclesfield		275 kV
Staythorpe	Nottinghamshire	Grendon		132 kV
Staythorpe	Nottinghamshire	Ratcliffe		132 kV
Staythorpe	Nottinghamshire	High Marnham	4 circuits	132 kV
Stella West	Tyne and Wear	Eccles		
Stella West	Tyne and Wear	Spennymoor	Code 4TQ	
Stocksbridge	South Yorkshire	Eggborough		
Stocksbridge	South Yorkshire	Stalybridge	Code 4ZO Trans-Pennine via Woodhead tunnel	
Stoke Bardolph	Nottinghamshire	Ratcliffe		
Stoke Bardolph	Nottinghamshire	High Marnham		
Stocking Pelham	Essex	Wymondley		132 kV
Stocking Pelham	Essex	Rye House		132 kV
Stocking Pelham	Essex	Burwell Main		132 kV
Stocking Pelham	Essex	Bramford		132 kV
Sundon	Central Bedfordshire	Elstree		132 kV
Sundon	Central Bedfordshire	East Claydon		132 kV
Sundon	Central Bedfordshire	Grendon		132 kV
Sundon	Central Bedfordshire	Wymondley		132 kV
Sutton Bridge power station	Lincolnshire	Walpole		
Swansea North	Swansea	Cilfynydd		
Swansea North	Swansea	Rhigos		
Swansea North	Swansea	Pembroke		
Taunton	Somerset	Alverdiscott	Code 4VW	
Taunton	Somerset	Exeter		
Taunton	Somerset	Hinkley Point		
Thornton	City of York	Drax	Code 4VC	
Thornton	City of York	Lackenby		
Thornton	City of York	Osbaldwick		
Thornton	City of York	Creyke Beck		
Thorpe Marsh	South Yorkshire	Keadby		
Thorpe Marsh	South Yorkshire	Brinsworth		
Thorpe Marsh	South Yorkshire	Stalybridge	Code 4ZO Trans–Pennine via Woodhead tunnel	
Tilbury	Essex	Kingsnorth	Includes Thames Cable Tunnel	275 kV, 132 kV
Tilbury	Essex	Barking		275 kV, 132 kV
Tilbury	Essex	Rayleigh Main		275 kV, 132 kV
Tod Point	Redcar and Cleveland	Lackenby		
Trawsfynydd	Gwynedd	Treuddyn		
Trawsfynydd	Gwynedd	Pentir	Code 4ZC	
Treuddyn	Flintshire	Connahs Quay		
Treuddyn	Flintshire	Trawsfynydd		
Treuddyn	Flintshire	Legacy		
Twinstead Tee	Essex	On Bramford–Stocking Pelham circuits		
Walham	Gloucestershire	Rassau		132 kV
Walham	Gloucestershire	Seven Springs		132 kV
Walpole	Norfolk	Burwell Main		220 kV, 132 kV
Walpole	Norfolk	Norwich Main	Code 4VV	220 kV, 132 kV
Walpole	Norfolk	West Burton		220 kV, 132 kV
Walpole	Norfolk	Feed from Sutton Bridge Power Station		220 kV, 132 kV
Waltham Cross	Hertfordshire	Rye House		275 kV
West Burton	Nottinghamshire	Walpole		132 kV
West Burton	Nottinghamshire	Keadby		132 kV
West Burton	Nottinghamshire	Cottam		132 kV
West Ham	Greater London	Barking		132 kV, 66 kV
West Ham	Greater London	City Road	Underground, along Lea Navigation, Hertford Union Canal and Regent's Canal	132 kV, 66 kV
West Ham	Greater London	Hackney	Lower Lea Valley Cable Tunnel	132 kV, 66 kV
West Thurrock	Essex	Barking		275 kV
West Thurrock	Essex	Northfleet East	Overhead Thames Crossing	275 kV
West Thurrock	Essex	Littlebrook	Includes Dartford Cable Tunnel	275 kV
West Weybridge	Surrey	Bramley	Code ZH	275 kV, 132 kV
Whitegate	Greater Manchester	Rochdale		275 kV, 132 kV
Whitson	Newport	Melksham		275 kV, 132 kV
Whitson	Newport	Imperial Park		275 kV, 132 kV
Willesden	Greater London	Kensal Green	Underground, along Grand Union Canal	275 kV, 132 kV, 66 kV, 22 kV
Willesden	Greater London	Beddington	Former ±266 kV HVDC Kingsnorth circuit (operational 1974–86)	
Willington	Derbyshire	Ratcliffe		
Wimbledon	Greater London	Kensal Green	London Power Tunnels, single circuit	275 kV, 132 kV
Wimbledon	Greater London	New Cross	Under construction	275 kV, 132 kV
Wylfa	Anglesey (Sir Ynys Mon)	Pentir		132 kV
Wymondley	Hertfordshire	Sundon		132 kV
Wymondley	Hertfordshire	Cottam Power Station		132 kV
Wymondley	Hertfordshire	Stocking Pelham	Code 4TB	132 kV

=== 275 kV substations ===
The 275 kV substations in England and Wales and their interconnections are given in the following table. The lower voltage transmission, if any, from the substation is also given.

England and Wales 275 kV substations
Substation name	Location county/unitary authority	Connection to other substation(s)	Remarks	Lower voltage transmission from substation
Aberthaw	Cardiff	Pyle		
Aberthaw	Cardiff	Upper Boat		
Aberthaw	Cardiff	Tremorfa		
Aldwarke	South Yorkshire	West Melton		
Aldwarke	South Yorkshire	Brinsworth		
Alpha Steel	Newport	Uskmouth		
Baglan Bay	Neath	Margam		
Baglan Bay	Neath	Swansea North		
Barking	Greater London	Redbridge		132 kV, 33 kV
Beddington	Greater London	Chessington	Code ZZU	132 kV
Beddington	Greater London	Wimbledon		132 kV
Berkswell	West Midlands	Coventry		
Berkswell	West Midlands	Feckenham		
Berkswell	West Midlands	Ocker Hill		
Birkenhead	Merseyside	Capenhurst		
Birkenhead	Merseyside	Lister Drive		
Bishops Wood	Staffordshire	2 links to Penn–Feckenham circuit		132 kV, 66 kV
Blyth	Northumberland	Stella West	Code XF	132 kV, 66 kV
Bradford West	West Yorkshire	Padiham		
Bradford West	West Yorkshire	Elland		
Bradford West	West Yorkshire	Kirkstall		
Bradford West	West Yorkshire	Monk Fryston		
Bredbury	Greater Manchester	Staylybridge		
Bredbury	Greater Manchester	Macclesfield		
Bredbury	Greater Manchester	South Manchester		
Brimsdown	Greater London	Waltham Cross		132 kV
Brimsdown	Greater London	Tottenham		132 kV
Brinsworth	South Yorkshire	Thurcroft		
Brinsworth	South Yorkshire	Templeborough		
Brinsworth	South Yorkshire	BOC operations centre Brinsworth		
Brinsworth	South Yorkshire	Chesterfield		
Brinsworth	South Yorkshire	Tinsley Park		
Brinsworth	South Yorkshire	Neeps End		
Bridgwater	Somerset	Hinkley Point		132 kV, 33 kV
Bushbury	West Midlands	link to Drakelow–Penn circuit		132 kV
Bustleholme	West Midlands	Nechells		132 kV
Bustleholme	West Midlands	Drakelow		132 kV
Capenhurst	Cheshire West and Chester	Frodsham		132 kV
Capenhurst	Cheshire West and Chester	Birkenhead		132 kV
Cardiff East	Cardiff	Pyle-Aberthaw circuit		
Cardiff East	Cardiff	Whitson		
Chessington	Surrey	West Weybridge	Code ZM	132 kV
Chessington	Surrey	Beddington	Code ZZU	132 kV
Chesterfield	Derbyshire	High Marnham		132 kV
Chesterfield	Derbyshire	Brinsworth		132 kV
Cilfynnyd	Rhondda	Upper Boat		132 kV
Coventry	West Midlands	Ratcliffe		132 kV, 33 kV
Coventry	West Midlands	Nechells		132 kV, 33 kV
Coventry	West Midlands	Berkswell		132 kV, 33 kV
Cowbridge Tee	Cardiff	On Aberthaw, Cardiff East, Pyle circuits		
Creyke Beck	East Yorkshire	Saltend North		
Daines	Greater Manchester	South Manchester		
Daines	Greater Manchester	400 kV substation		
Drakelow	Worcestershire	Bustleholm		132 kV
Drakelow	Worcestershire	Penn		132 kV
Dungeness	Kent	Power station 275 kV to 400 kV step-up transformer		
Ealing	Greater London	Laleham		
Ealing	Greater London	Willesden		
Elland	West Yorkshire	Ferrybridge		
Elland	West Yorkshire	Stalybridge		
Elland	West Yorkshire	Bradford West		
Elland	West Yorkshire	Kirkstall		
Elstree	Hertfordshire	Waltham Cross		132 kV
Elstree	Hertfordshire	Watford		132 kV
Elstree	Hertfordshire	Mill Hill		132 kV
Feckenham	Worcestershire	Bishops Wood		
Feckenham	Worcestershire	Berkswell		
Ferrybridge	North Yorkshire	Monk Fryston		
Ferrybridge	North Yorkshire	Skelton Grange		
Ferrybridge	North Yorkshire	Elland		
Ffestiniog	Gwynedd	Trawsfynydd		
Fiddlers Ferry	Warrington	Rainhill		132 kV
Fiddlers Ferry	Warrington	Frodsham		132 kV
Fourstones	Northumberland	Stella West		
Fourstones	Northumberland	Harker	Code XB	
Frodsham	Halton	Fiddlers Ferry		132 kV
Frodsham	Halton	Capenhurst		132 kV
Grangetown	Redcar and Cleveland	Feed from Lackenby	Underground cable	
Greystones	Redcar and Cleveland	Lackenby (400 kV)		
Greystones	Redcar and Cleveland	Tod Point		
Hackney	Greater London	Tottenham		132 kV, 66 kV
Hams Hall	Warwickshire	Coventry		132 kV
Hams Hall	Warwickshire	Bustleholm		132 kV
Hams Hall	Warwickshire	Nechells		132 kV
Harker	Cumbria	Fourstones	Code XB	132 kV
Hartmoor	Durham	Hartlepool power station	Code 4TH	
Hartmoor	Durham	Hawthorn Pit	Code ZZA	
Hartlepool power station	Hartlepool	Saltholme	Code 4TG	
Hartlepool power station	Hartlepool	Hartmoor	Code 4TH	
Hawthorn Pit	Durham	Hartmoor	Code ZZA	66 kV
Hawthorn Pit	Durham	Norton	Code 4TF	66 kV
Hawthorn Pit	Durham	Offerton	Code ZZA	66 kV
Hedon	East Yorkshire	Creyke Beck		
Hedon	East Yorkshire	Saltend		
High Marnham	Nottinghamshire	Chesterfield		
High Marnham	Nottinghamshire	Thurcroft-West Melton circuit		
Hinkley Point	Somerset	Bridgwater		
Hurst	Greater London	New Cross		132 kV
Hurst	Greater London	Littlebrook		132 kV
Iron Acton	South Gloucestershire	Melksham		132 kV, 33 kV
Iron Acton	South Gloucestershire	Whitson		132 kV, 33 kV
Iver	Buckinghamshire	Watford		132 kV
Iver	Buckinghamshire	Laleham	Code VW	
Iver	Buckinghamshire	North Hyde		
Jordanthorpe	South Yorkshire	Brinsworth		
Jordanthorpe	South Yorkshire	Pitsmoor		
Kearsley	Greater Manchester	Whitegate		132 kV
Kirkby	Merseyside	Washway Farm		132 kV
Kirkby	Merseyside	Rainhill		132 kV
Kirkstall	West Yorkshire	Elland		
Kirkstall	West Yorkshire	Bradford West		
Kirkstall	West Yorkshire	Skelton Grange		
Kitwell	West Midlands	Bishops Wood		
Kitwell	West Midlands	Ocker Hill		
Kitwell	West Midlands	Oldbury		
Knaresborough	North Yorkshire	Monk Fryston		
Knaresborough	North Yorkshire	Poppleton		
Lackenby	Redcar and Cleveland	Tod Point		66 kV
Laleham	Surrey	Iver	Code VW	132 kV
Laleham	Surrey	Ealing		132 kV
Laleham	Surrey	West Weybridge		132 kV
Lister Drive	Merseyside	Kirkby		
Lister Drive	Merseyside	Birkenhead		
Littlebrook	Kent	Hurst	Code VN	
Macclesfield	Cheshire	Bredbury		
Margam	Neath	Pyle		
Margam	Neath	Baglan Bay		
Melksham	Wiltshire	Iron Acton		132 kV
Mill Hill	Greater London	Elstree		132 kV
Monk Fryston	North Yorkshire	Ferrybridge		
Monk Fryston	North Yorkshire	Poppleton		
Monk Fryston	North Yorkshire	Knaresborough		
Monk Fryston	North Yorkshire	Bradford West		
Nechells	West Midlands	Hams Hall		
Nechells	West Midlands	Bustleholm		
Neepsend	South Yorkshire	Brinsworth		
New Cross	Greater London	Wimbledon		132 kV, 66 kV
New Cross	Greater London	Hurst		132 kV, 66 kV
North Hyde	Greater London	Iver		66 kV, 11 kV
Norton Lees	South Yorkshire	Pitsmoor		
Norton Lees	South Yorkshire	Sheffield City		
Norton Lees	South Yorkshire	Jordanthorpe		
Norton Lees	South Yorkshire	Brinsworth		
Norton	Stockton	Hawthorn Pit		
Norton	Stockton	Saltholme		
Ocker Hill	West Midlands	Willenhall		
Ocker Hill	West Midlands	Berkswell		
Ocker Hill	West Midlands	Kitwell		
Offerton	Tyne and Wear	Hawthorn Pit	Code ZZA	
Offerton	Tyne and Wear	West Boldon	Code ZZA	
Oldbury	West Midlands	Kitwell		
Oldbury	West Midlands	400 kV from Drakelow		
Penn	West Midlands	Bustleholm		132 kV
Penn	West Midlands	Feckenham		132 kV
Penwortham	Lancashire	Washway Farm		132 kV
Pitsmoor	South Yorkshire	Sheffield City		
Pitsmoor	South Yorkshire	Wincobank		
Pitsmoor	South Yorkshire	Neepsend		
Pitsmoor	South Yorkshire	Jordanthorpe		
Pitsmoor	South Yorkshire	Templeborough		
Poppleton	North Yorkshire	Knaresborough		
Poppleton	North Yorkshire	Monk Fryston		
Pyle	Swansea	Aberthaw		
Pyle	Swansea	Margam		
Rainhill	Merseyside	Kirkby		132 kV
Rainhill	Merseyside	Fiddlers Ferry		132 kV
Ratcliffe	Leicestershire	Coventry		132 kV
Redbridge	Greater London	Tottenham		
Redbridge	Greater London	Barking		
Rochdale	Lancashire	400 kV from Eggborough		
Rochdale	Lancashire	Stalybridge		
Rochdale	Lancashire	Whitegate		
Saltend North	East Yorkshire	Saltend South		132 kV, 33 kV
Saltend North	East Yorkshire	Creyke Beck		132 kV, 33 kV
Saltend South	East Yorkshire	Saltend North		
Saltholme	Redcar and Cleveland	Sabic Chemicals		
Saltholme	Redcar and Cleveland	Hartlepool power station	Code ZZA	
Sellinge	Kent	Sellinge Converter	270 kV DC to/from France	
Sheffield City	Sheffield	Brinsworth		
Sheffield City	Sheffield	Neepsend		
St. John's Wood	Greater London	Tottenham		
Skelton Grange	Leeds	Ferrybridge		
Skelton Grange	Leeds	Kirkstall		
South Manchester	Greater Manchester	Bredbury		
South Manchester	Greater Manchester	Daines		
South Shields	Tyne and Wear	Tynemouth		
South Shields	Tyne and Wear	West Boldon		
Spennymoor	Durham	400 kV?		
Stalybridge	Greater Manchester	400 kV feed		
Stalybridge	Greater Manchester	Bredbury		
Stalybridge	Greater Manchester	Rochdale		
Stalybridge	Greater Manchester	Elland		
Stella West	Tyne and Wear	Blyth	Code XF	
Stella West	Tyne and Wear	Fourstones		
Swansea North	Swansea	400 kV feed		
Swansea North	Swansea	Baglan Bay		
Templeborough	South Yorkshire	Brinsworth		
Templeborough	South Yorkshire	Pitsmoor		
Thorpe Marsh	South Yorkshire	West Melton		66 kV
Thurcroft	South Yorkshire	Link from High Marnham–? circuit		66 kV, 11 kV
Thurcroft	South Yorkshire	Brinsworth		66 kV, 11 kV
Tilbury	Essex	Warley	Code Z3B	
Tinsley Park	South Yorkshire	Brinsworth		
Tod Point	Redcar and Cleveland	Greystones		
Tod Point	Redcar and Cleveland	Hartlepool		
Tottenham	Greater London	Brimsdown		
Tottenham	Greater London	St. John's Wood		
Tottenham	Greater London	Redbridge		
Tottenham	Greater London	Hackney		
Trawsfynydd	Gwynedd	Ffestiniog		
Tremorfa	Cardiff	Aberthaw		
Tremorfa	Cardiff	Whitson		
Tynemouth	Tyne and Wear	West Boldon		
Tynemouth	Tyne and Wear	Blyth		
Upper Boat	Rhondda	Cilfynnyd		132 kV
Upper Boat	Rhondda	Aberthaw		132 kV
Uskmouth	Newport	Whitson		
Uskmouth	Newport	Alpha Steel		
Waltham Cross	Hertfordshire	Warley		
Waltham Cross	Hertfordshire	Brimsdown		
Waltham Cross	Hertfordshire	Elstree		
Warley	Essex	Tilbury	Code Z3B	132 kV
Warley	Essex	Waltham Cross		
Washway Farm	Lancashire	Penwortham		132 kV
Washway Farm	Lancashire	Kirkby		132 kV
Watford	Hertfordshire	Elstree		132 kV
Watford	Hertfordshire	Iver		132 kV
West Boldon	Tyne and Wear	Offerton	Code ZZA	66 kV
West Boldon	Tyne and Wear	Tynemouth	Code ZZA	66 kV
West Melton	South Yorkshire	Thorpe Marsh		
West Melton	South Yorkshire	Thurcroft		
West Weybridge	Surrey	Laleham		132 kV
West Weybridge	Surrey	Chessington	Code ZM	132 kV
Whitegate	Greater Manchester	Kearsley		132 kV
Whitegate	Greater Manchester	Rochdale		132 kV
Whitson	Newport	Iron Acton		
Whitson	Newport	Uskmouth		
Whitson	Newport	Cardiff East		
Whitson	Newport	Tremorfa		
Wincobank	South Yorkshire	Pitsmoor		
Wincobank	South Yorkshire	Templeborough		
Willenhall	West Midlands	Bushbury		
Willenhall	West Midlands	Ocker Hill		
Willesden	Greater London	Ealing		132 kV, 66 kV
Willington	Derbyshire	400 kV feed		
Wilton	Redcar and Cleveland	Feed from Wilton power stations		
Wimbledon	Greater London	Beddington		132 kV
Wimbledon	Greater London	New Cross		132 kV

== Scotland ==
=== 400 kV substations ===
The 400 kV substations in Scotland and their interconnections are given in the following table. The identification codes for the interconnecting lines and the lower voltage transmission, if any, from the substation are also given.

There are two interconnections between England and Scotland. On the west coast the 400 kV overland line between Harker substation in Cumbria and Gretna substation, Dumfries and Galloway. On the east coast the 400 kV line between Stella West substation, Tyne and Wear and Eccles substation, Borders.

In addition the 600 kV DC Western HVDC underground and sub-marine link connects Flintshire Bridge Converter station, in Flintshire Wales, to the Western HVDC Converter station near Hunterston.

Scotland 400 kV substations
Substation name	Location Council/Unitary Authority	Connection to other 400 kV substation(s):	Remarks	Lower voltage transmission from substation
Beauly	Highland	Fort Augustus		275 kV, 132 kV
Branxton	East Lothian	Torness		
Coalburn	South Lanarkshire	Strathaven		
Coalburn	South Lanarkshire	Elvanfoot		
Cockenzie	East Lothian	Eccles		275 kV
Crystal Rig wind farm	East Lothian	On Torness–Smeaton circuits		
Denny North	Falkirk	Fort Augustus		275 kV, 132 kV
Devol Moor	Inverclyde	Inverkip		132 kV, 33 kV
Eccles	Borders	Stella West (England)		132 kV, 33 kV
Eccles	Borders	Torness		132 kV, 33 kV
Eccles	Borders	Cockenzie		132 kV, 33 kV
Elvanfoot	South Lanarkshire	Moffat		275 kV
Elvanfoot	South Lanarkshire	Coalburn		275 kV
Elvanfoot North	South Lanarkshire			
Fallago Rig wind farm	East Lothian	On Torness–Smeaton circuits		
Fort Augustus	Highland	Beauly		275 kV, 132 kV
Fort Augustus	Highland	Denny		275 kV, 132 kV
Gretna	Dumfries and Galloway	Harker (England)		132 kV
Gretna	Dumfries and Galloway	Moffat		132 kV
Hunterston Power station	North Ayrshire	Hunterston North & East		400 kV
Hunterston Western HVDC Converter (600 kV DC)	North Ayrshire	Flintshire Bridge Converter (Wales)		400 kV
Hunterston North	North Ayrshire	Neilston/Windyhill		400 kV
Hunterston East	North Ayrshire	Neilston		400 kV
Inverkip	Inverclyde	Devol Moor		
Inverkip	Inverclyde	Link on Neilston–Windy Hill circuit		
Inverkip	Inverclyde	Neilston		
Kilmarnock South	East Ayrshire	Neilston		275 kV
Kilmarnock South	East Ayrshire	Strathven		275 kV
Melgarve	Highland	Link on Fort Augustus–Denny circuit		275 kV
Moffat	Dumfries	Gretna		
Moffat	Dumfries	Elvanfoot		
Neilston	Renfrewshire	Kilmarnock South		275 kV, 132 kV
Neilston	Renfrewshire	Hunterston		275 kV, 132 kV
Neilston	Renfrewshire	Inverkip		275 kV, 132 kV
Neilston	Renfrewshire	Windyhill		275 kV, 132 kV
Smeaton	East Lothian	Torness		275 kV
Smeaton	East Lothian	Wishaw		275 kV
Strathaven	South Lanarkshire	Kilmarnock South		275 kV
Strathaven	South Lanarkshire	Wishaw		275 kV
Strathaven	South Lanarkshire	Coalburn		275 kV
Torness	East Lothian	Smeaton		
Torness	East Lothian	Eccles		
Windyhill	West Dunbarton	Neilston		275 kV, 132 kV
Wishaw	North Lanarkshire	Strathaven		275 kV
Wishaw	North Lanarkshire	Smeaton		275 kV

=== 275 kV substations ===
The 275 kV substations in Scotland and their interconnections are given in the following table. The identification codes for the interconnecting lines and the lower voltage transmission, if any, from the substation are also given.

The Moyle Interconnector provides a high-voltage link between the Scotland and Northern Ireland 275 kV systems.

Scotland 275 kV substations
Substation name	Location council/unitary authority	Connection to other 275 kV substation(s):	Remarks	Lower voltage transmission from substation
Auchencrosh Static Inverter Plant	South Ayrshire	Mark Hill		
Auchencrosh Static Inverter Plant	South Ayrshire	Moyle Interconnector North and South	250 kV DC to Northern Ireland	
Ayr	South Ayrshiire	Link from Coylton-Kilmarnock Town circuits		
Beauly	Highland	Feed from 400 kV		132 kV
Beauly	Highland	Fasnakyle		132 kV
Beauly	Highland	Fyrish		132 kV
Beauly	Highland	Knocknagael		132 kV
Blackhillock	Moray	Knocknagael		
Blackhillock	Moray	Keith		
Blackhillock	Moray	Kintore		
Blackhillock	Moray	400 kV feed from Spittal		
Busby	East Renfrewshire	Neilston		
Busby	East Renfrewshire	Giffnock		
Busby	East Renfrewshire	Strathaven		
Clyde North	South Lanarkshire	Elvanfoot 400 kV		
Clyde South	South Lanarkshire	Elvanfoot 400 kV		
Clyde's Mill	Glasgow	400 kV feed from Strathaven		
Clyde's Mill	Glasgow	Easterhouse		
Clyde's Mill	Glasgow	Longannet		
Clyde's Mill	Glasgow	Dalmaarnock/Charlotte Street		
Clyde's Mill	Glasgow	East Kilbride		
Coatbridge	North Lanarkshire	Newarthill		
Cockenzie	East Lothian	400 kV feed from Eccles		
Cockenzie	East Lothian	Smeaton		
Cockenzie	East Lothian	Kaimes		
Coylton	South Ayrshire	Kilmarnock Town		132 kV
Coylton	South Ayrshire	New Cumnock		132 kV
Cruachan	Argyll and Bute	Dalmally		
Currie	Edinburgh	Grangemouth		132 kV (Sighthill)
Currie	Edinburgh	Kincardine		132 kV (Sighthill)
Currie	Edinburgh	Kaimes		132 kV (Sighthill)
Currie	Edinburgh	Sighthill		132 kV (Sighthill)
Dalmally	Argyll and Bute	Windyhill		
Dalmally	Argyll and Bute	Inverarnan		
Dalmally	Argyll and Bute	Cruachan		
Denny	Falkirk	400 kV feed from Melgrave		132 kV
Denny	Falkirk	Longannet		132 kV
Denny	Falkirk	Bonnybridge		132 kV
Denny	Falkirk	Lambhill		132 kV
Denny	Falkirk	Tummel		132 kV
Dounreay	Highland	Thurso South		132 kV
Dounreay	Highland	Loch Buidhe		132 kV
Easterhouse	Glasgow	Longannet		
Easterhouse	Glasgow	Clyde's Mill		
Easterhouse	Glasgow	Newarthill		
East Kilbride South	South Lanarkshire	Strathaven		
East Kilbride South	South Lanarkshire	Neilston		
East Kilbride South	South Lanarkshire	Whitelee		
East Kilbride South	South Lanarkshire	Whitelee Extension		
Fasnakyle	Highland	Beauly		
Fasnakyle	Highland	Fork Augustus		
Fetteresso	Aberdeenshire	Kintore		132 kV
Fetteresso	Aberdeenshire	Tealing		132 kV
Fetteresso	Aberdeenshire	Kincardine		132 kV
Fort Augustus	Highland	Fasnakyle		132 kV
Fort Augustus	Highland	Tummel		132 kV
Foyers	Highland	Knocknagael		
Fyrish	Highland	Loch Buidhe		132 kV
Fyrish	Highland	Beauly		132 kV
Glenrothes	Fife	Tealing		
Glenrothes	Fife	Westfield		
Grangemouth	Falkirk	Kincardine		
Grangemouth	Falkirk	Currie		
Inverarnan	Stirling	Windyhill		132 kV
Inverarnan	Stirling	Dalmally		132 kV
Kaimes	Edinburgh	Currie		
Kaimes	Edinburgh	Dewar		
Kaimes	Edinburgh	Cockenzie		
Kaimes	Edinburgh	Smeaton		
Kilmarnock Town	East Ayrshire	Colyton		132 kV
Kilmarnock Town	East Ayrshire	Feed from 400 kV Kilmarnock South		132 kV
Kincardine	Fife	Fetteresso		
Kincardine	Fife	Tealing		
Kincardine	Fife	Grangemouth		
Kincardine	Fife	Currie		
Kincardine	Fife	Longannet		
Kintore	Aberdeenshire	400 kV feed from Blackhillock		132 kV
Kintore	Aberdeenshire	Blackhillock		132 kV
Kintore	Aberdeenshire	Fetteresso		132 kV
Kintore	Aberdeenshire	Tealing		132 kV
Kintore	Aberdeenshire	Peterhead		132 kV
Kintore	Aberdeenshire	Persley		132 kV
Knocknagael	Highland	Beauly		132 kV
Knocknagael	Highland	Foyers		132 kV
Knocknagael	Highland	Tomatin		132 kV
Knocknagael	Highland	Blackhillock		132 kV
Lambhill	Glasgow	Denny		
Lambhill	Glasgow	Windyhill		
Lambhill	Glasgow	Port Dundas		132 kV
Lambhill	Glasgow	West George Street		132 kV
Loch Buidhe	Highland	Dounreay		132 kV
Loch Buidhe	Highland	Fyrish		132 kV
Longannet	Fife	Westfield		
Longannet	Fife	Mossmorran		
Longannet	Fife	Easterhouse		
Longannet	Fife	Kincardine		
Longannet	Fife	Bonnybridge		
Longannet	Fife	Denny		
Longannet	Fife	Clyde's Mill		
Mark Hill	South Ayrshire	Auchencrosh		132 kV
Mark Hill	South Ayrshire	Kilgallioch		132 kV
Mark Hill	South Ayrshire	Coylton		132 kV
Neilston	East Renfrewshire	400 kV feed from Hunterston East		132 kV
Neilston	East Renfrewshire	East Kilbride South		132 kV
Neilston	East Renfrewshire	Busby		132 kV
Neilston	East Renfrewshire	Windyhill		132 kV
Newarthill	North Lanarkshire	400 kV feed from Wishaw		
Newarthill	North Lanarkshire	Easterhouse		
Newarthill	North Lanarkshire	Coatbridge		
New Cumnock	East Ayrshire	Coylton		132 kV
Persley	Aberdeen	Peterhead		132 kV
Persley	Aberdeen	Kintore		132 kV
Peterhead	Aberdeenshire	Blackhillock		132 kV
Peterhead	Aberdeenshire	Persley		132 kV
Peterhead	Aberdeenshire	Kintore		132 kV
Smeaton	Fife	400 kV feed from Fallago		
Smeaton	Fife	Cockenzie		
Smeaton	Fife	Kaimes		
Smeaton	Fife	Portobello		132 kV
Smeaton	Fife	Shrubhill		132 kV
Spittal	Highland	Thurso South		132 kV
Tealing	Angus	Kintore		132 kV
Tealing	Angus	Kincardine		132 kV
Tealing	Angus	Fetteresso		132 kV
Tealing	Angus	Glenrothes		132 kV
Tealing	Angus	Westfield		132 kV
Thurso South	Highland	Dounreay		132 kV
Thurso South	Highland	Spittal		132 kV
Tomatin	Highland	Knocknagael		132 kV
Tummel	Perthshire	Fort Augustus		132 kV
Tummel	Perthshire	Denny		132 kV
Westfield	Fife	Glenrothes		132 kV
Westfield	Fife	Mossmorran		132 kV
Westfield	Fife	Tealing		132 kV
Westfield	Fife	Longannet		132 kV
Whitelee	Borders	East Kilbride South		
Whitelee Extension	Borders	East Kilbride South		
Windyhill	West Dunbartonshire	Neilston		132 kV
Windyhill	West Dunbartonshire	Lambhill		132 kV
Windyhill	West Dunbartonshire	Dalmally		132 kV
Windyhill	West Dunbartonshire	Inverarnan		132 kV
Windyhill	West Dunbartonshire	Drumchapel		132 kV

== Northern Ireland ==
=== 275 kV substations ===
There are no 400 kV systems in Northern Ireland; the highest transmission voltage is 275 kV. The substations and their interconnections are given in the table. The lower voltage (generally 110 kV) transmission from the substation is also given.

Northern Ireland 275 kV substations
Substation name	Location County/Borough	Connection to other 275 kV substation(s):	Remarks	Lower voltage transmission from substation
Ballycronan More HVDC Inverter	Antrim	Moyle Interconnector North and South	250 kV DC from Scotland	
Ballycronan More HVDC Inverter	Antrim	Ballylumford		
Ballycronan More HVDC Inverter	Antrim	Hannahstown		
Ballylumford power station	Antrim	Kells		110 kV
Ballylumford power station	Antrim	Ballycronan More		110 kV
Castlereagh	Lisburn and Castlereagh City	Tandragee		110 kV
Castlereagh	Lisburn and Castlereagh City	Ballycronan More		110 kV
Hannahstown	Antrim	Castlereagh		
Hannahstown	Antrim	Magherafelt		
Kells	Antrim	Ballylumford		110 kV
Kells	Antrim	Kilroot		110 kV
Kells	Antrim	Kells		110 kV
Kilroot power station	Antrim	Tandragee–Castlereagh circuits		110 kV, 33 kV
Kilroot power station	Antrim	Magherafelt		110 kV, 33 kV
Lisahally power station	Derry	Tamnamore		110 kV
Magherafelt	Londonderry	Kells		
Magherafelt	Londonderry	Lisahally power station		
Magherafelt	Londonderry	Tandragee		
Tamnamore	Tyrone	Magherafelt		110 kV
Tamnamore	Tyrone	Castlereagh		110 kV
Tandragee	Armagh	Louth (Republic of Ireland)	Interconnector	110 kV
Tandragee	Armagh	Tamnamore		110 kV
Tandragee	Armagh	Castlereagh		110 kV

== See also ==
- National Grid (Great Britain)
- Northern Ireland Electricity
- List of power stations in England
- List of power stations in Scotland
- List of power stations in Wales
- List of power stations in Northern Ireland
- List of high-voltage transmission links in the United Kingdom
