= Hackney Power Station =

Power Station in UK

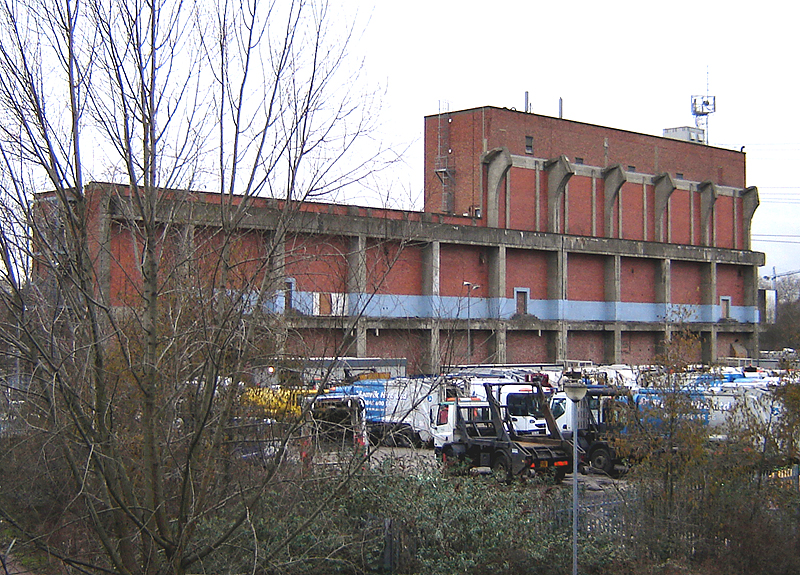
- Country: England
- Location: Hackney, London
- Coordinates: 51.55870°N 0.04010°W
- Status: Decommissioned and demolished
- Commission date: A 1901, B 1954
- Decommission date: A 1969, B 1976
- Owner: As operator
- Operators: Borough of Hackney (1901–1948); British Electricity Authority (1948–1955); Central Electricity Authority (1955–1957); Central Electricity Generating Board (1958–1976)

Thermal power station
- Primary fuel: Coal
- Secondary fuel: Refuse

Power generation
- Units operational: A: 2 × 30 MW, B: 2 × 33 MW and 1 × 30 MW
- Units decommissioned: All
- Nameplate capacity: 92 MW
- Annual net output: (See graphs below)

External links
- Commons: Related media on Commons

Hackney Power Station (also known as Millfields Power Station or Millfields Electricity Generating Station) was a coal-fired power station situated at Lea Bridge on the River Lee Navigation in London. It was commissioned in 1901 and decommissioned in 1976.

== History ==
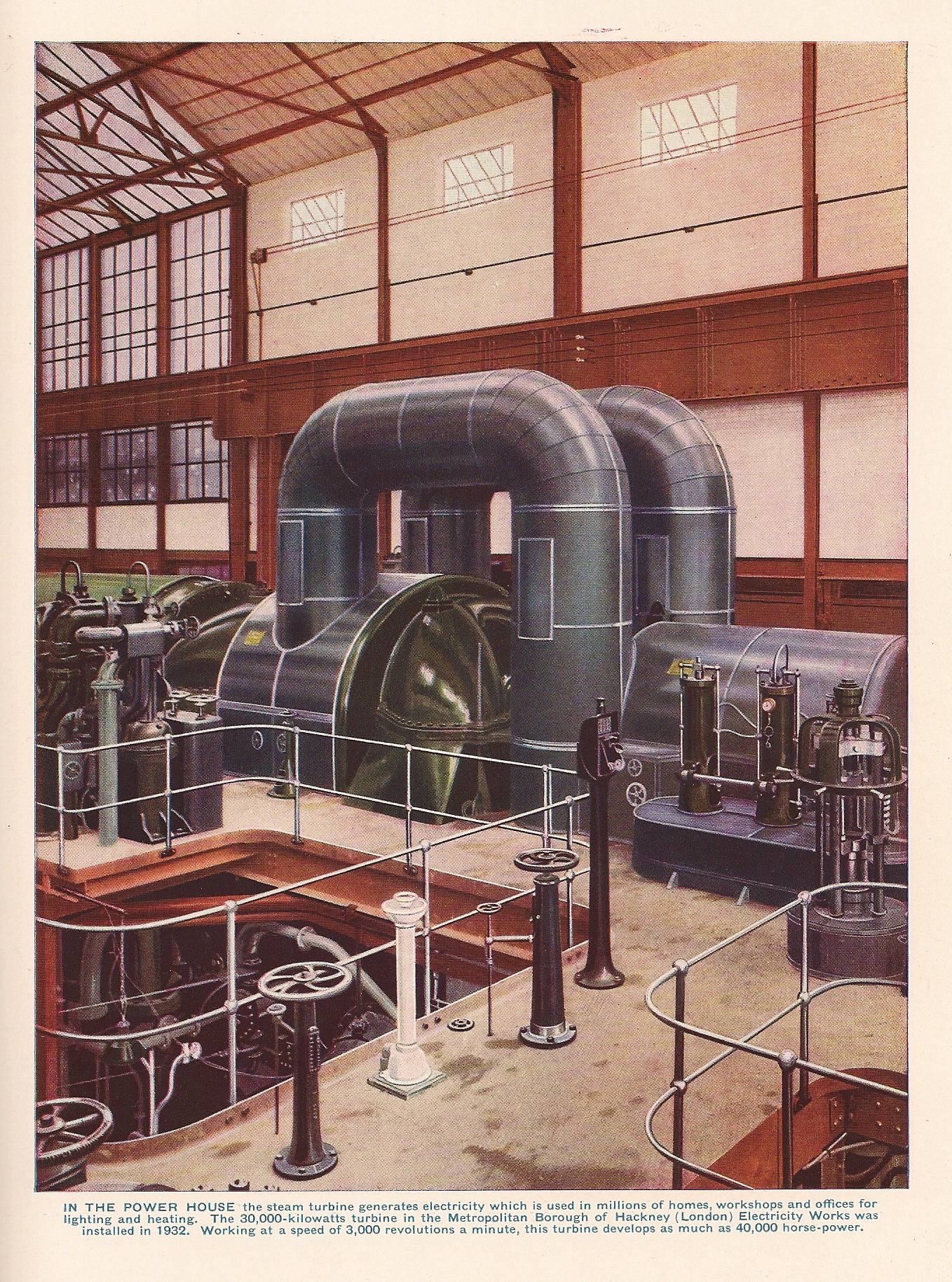
A turbine in the A station, 1932

The "A" station, opened on 31 October 1901, was built by the London Borough of Hackney. The Millfields site was selected because it had abundant River Lea Navigation water for cooling and allowed for barge-bourne coal delivery. By 1918 most factory machinery in Hackney was powered by electricity. It began to bulk supply electricity to Stoke Newington in 1928. The first alternating current transformer was connected in 1931, Hackney Power Station had been selected to form part of the National Grid Scheme operated by the Central Electricity Board. The site suffered no major incedents during WWII.

Upon nationalisation of the electricity industry in 1948, the power station passed to the British Electricity Authority. It also burned local refuse. The A station closed in 1969.

Following nationalisation, a "B" station was built, coming to use between 1954 and 1957. The B station was itself closed on 25 October 1976 with a generating capacity of 92 MW. It has been partially demolished, a sub-station remaining in part of the original buildings.

Coal was originally shipped up the Navigation from the Thames. However, in later years, as lighterage declined, up to thirty lorries per day transported coal to the station; the station was isolated from the railway system by the Lea and Hackney Marshes.

In 1967 it was reported by a resident that coal dust from lorries delivering coal to Hackney power station "lies like a black carpet in the front of our houses". A Ministry of Transport spokesman said that delivering coal to the station by road instead of barges saved £33,450 a year.

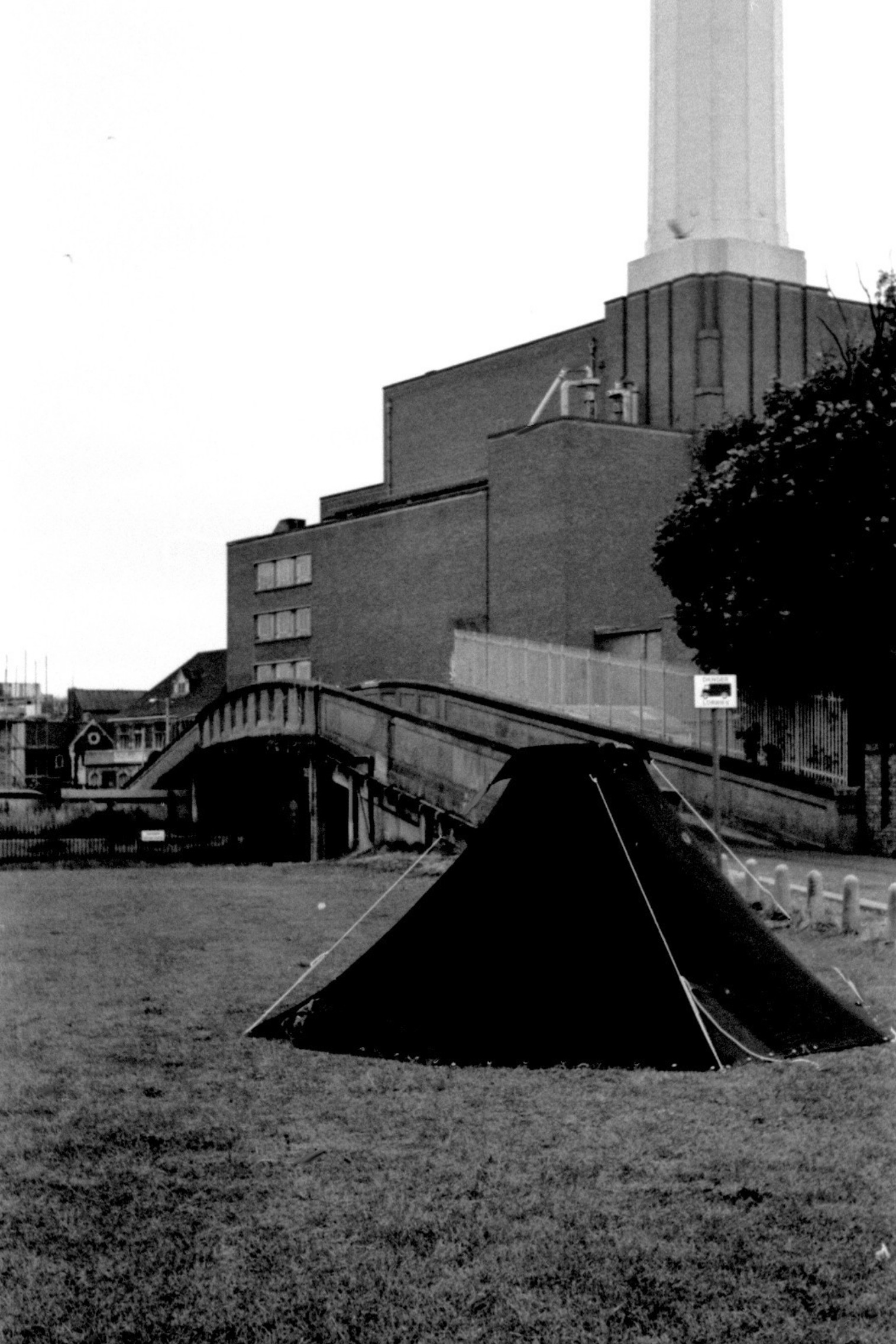
Hackney Power Station's chimney, since demolished

Parts of the site and the land immediately adjacent to it now serve as the Hackney Council Millfields Waste Depot and electricity substations operated by UK Power Networks and National Grid, including 66kV, 132kV, 275kV and 400kV substations.

The power station and its chimney features in a 1977 silent short film by experimental filmmaker John Smith titled Hackney Marshes - November 4th 1977.

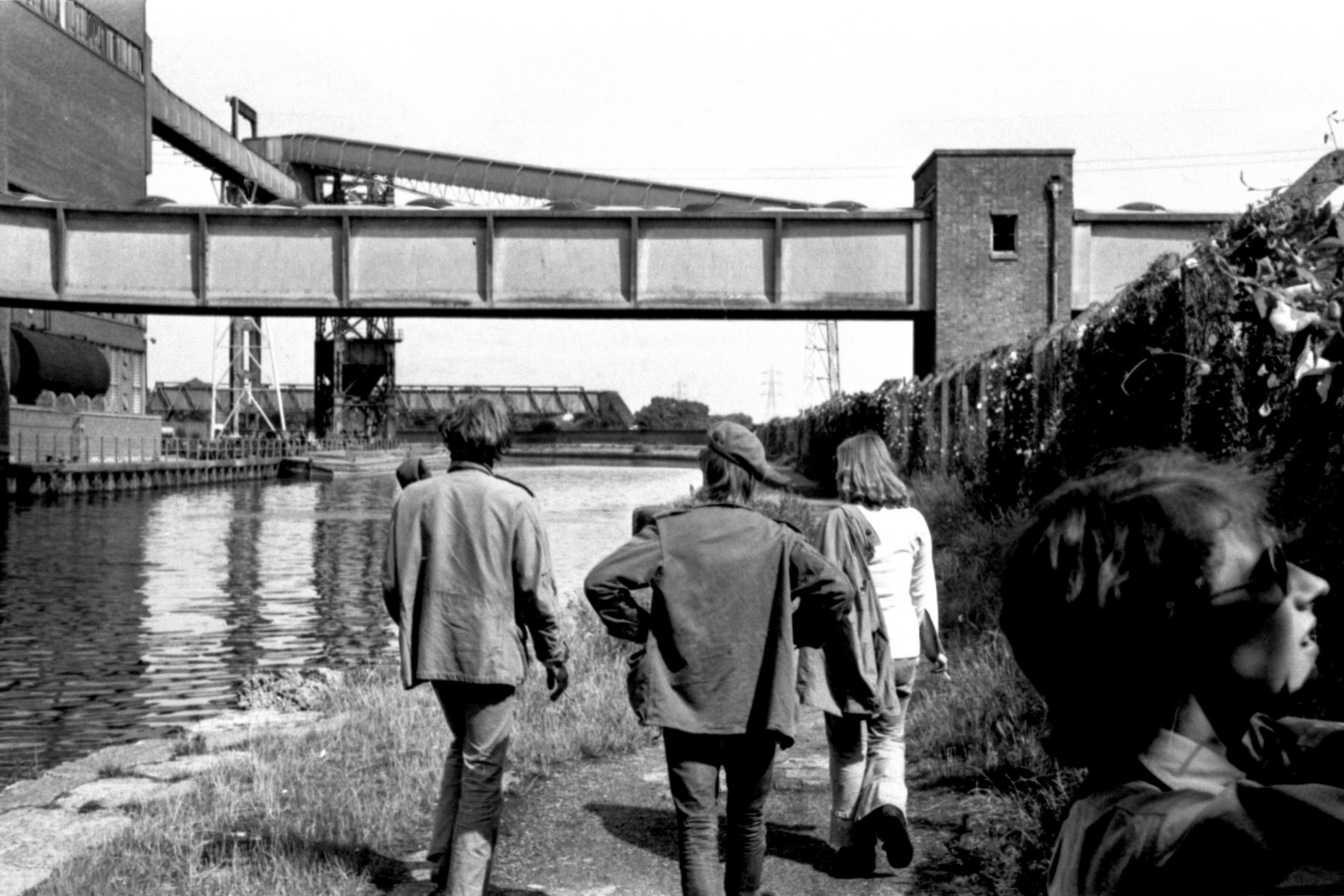
View of Hackney Power Station and the Lee Navigation in 1973

=== Specification ===
New generating equipment was added as the demand for electricity increased. The generating capacity, maximum load, and electricity generated and sold was as follows:

Hackney A generating capacity, load and electricity produced and sold, 1903–46
Year	Generating capacity, MW	Maximum load, MW	Electricity generated, GWh	Electricity sold, GWh
1903/4	3.37	1.48	2.55	2.18
1912/3	4.80	4.292	8.999	7.812
1918/9	12.200	7.410	18.195	16.217
1919/20	18.200	9.636	17.341	14.774
1923/4	28.200	12.600	26.393	22.199
1936/7	61.000	31.500	177.996	71.529
1946		11.540	209.055	197.733

The station was first commissioned in October, 1901, when the plant consisted of two Willans and Robinson 500 h.p. engines, each driving 2 x 150 kW J. H. Holmes dynamos coupled in tandem, and two Belliss and Morcom 1,000 h.p. engines, each driving two Johnson-Lundell 300 KW dynamos in tandem, making a total capacity of 1,800 KW. The Hughes and Stirling boilers producing steam at 250 Ib sq in. were fired by refuse and were situated in the destructor works adjoining the engine room. This was in the days when the refuse collected in the borough contained a large percentage of partly burnt coal und ash. A second 1,500-kW Westinghouse dynamo driven by a Belliss triple-expansion vertical steam engine was added in 1905 along with a similar set in 1909. By 1914, a 3,000 kW Willans & Robinson turbo alternator had been installed along with two 5,000 kW turbo alternators all powered from eight water boilers each of 33,000 Ib/hr. In 1918, a 6,000 kW Parson turbo alternator set was added, running at 3000 rpm - high for the time at that size.

The stations total capacity had now risen to 28,200 kW consisting of three Belliss and two Willans triple expansion steam engines totalling 4,200 kW. Then the turbine room contained the three existing sets (i) 3,000-KW Willans-G.E.C (1914), (ii) 5,000 kW Parsons (1914) and (iii) 6,000 kW Parsons (1917) Parson to which in October 1923 a new 10,000 kW 6,600 V 3 phase turbine set supplied by Parsons was bought into use. This was powered from four Babcock & Wilcox boilers producing 33,000 Ib. per hour. The station generated 21.465 GWh of electricity, in 1923 some of this was used in the plant, the total amount sold was 18.582 GWh. The revenue from sales of current was £151,291, this gave a surplus of revenue over expenses of £86,419.

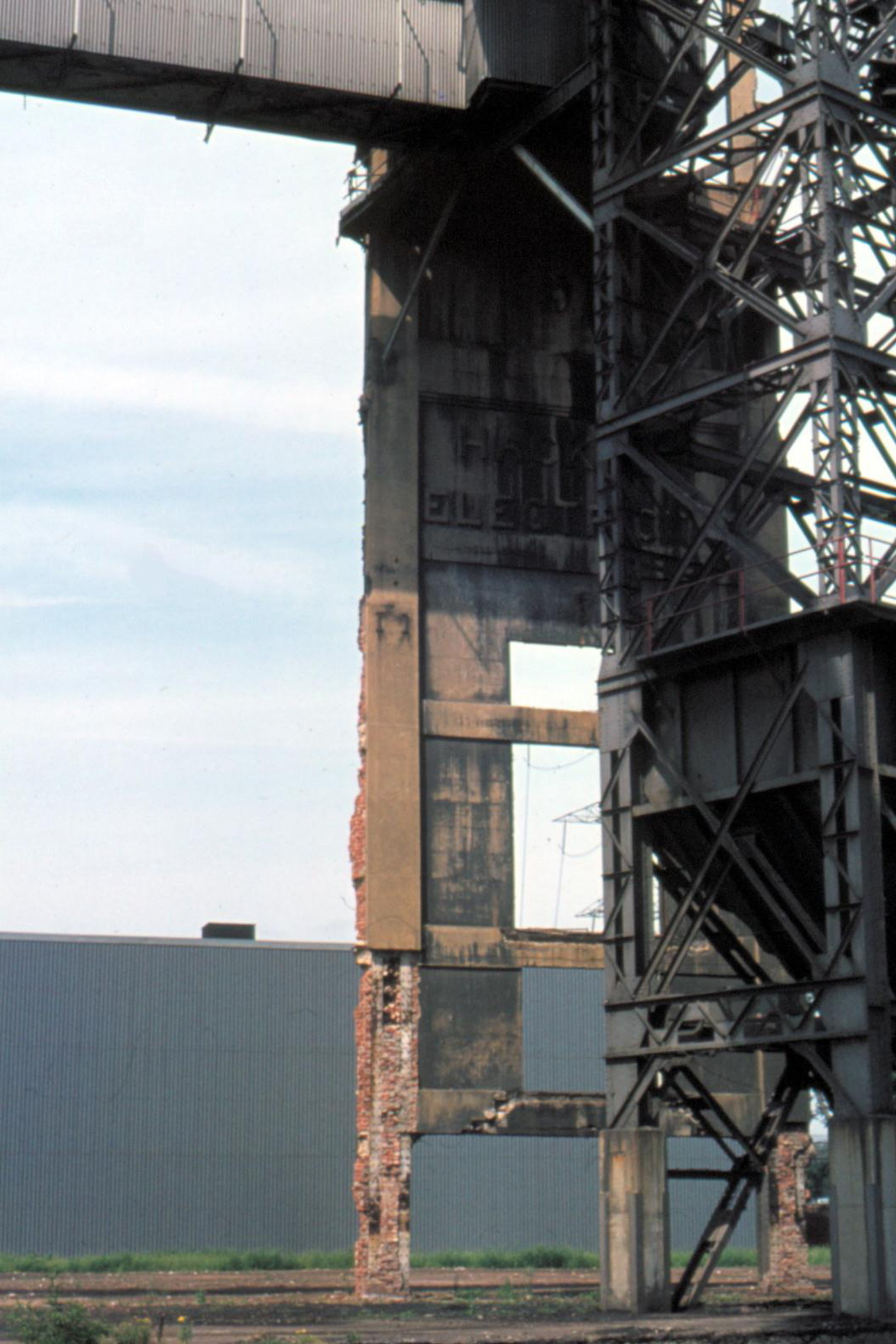
View of Hackney Power Station, 1973

The station was expanded again in 1932 with new boiler plant consisting of three Simon-Carves Ltd multi-drum units each evaporating 125,000 lb/hr. These boilers were fitted with George Kent Ltd automatic boilers controls and was the first UK power station to utilise such an arrangement. These boilers fed a Parsons 30,000 kW turbo alternator. This was the fourth Parsons set following on from a 7,500 kW (1918), 10,000 kW (1920), a 10,000 kW (1925). The efficiency being progressively improved from the first set consuming 14,540 BTU / kWh (equivalent to a thermal efficiency for the whole set of 23.47%) to 11,080 BTU / kWh ( thermal efficiency of 30.79%) for the latest set.

A further 30,000 kW Parson turbo alternator set was commissioned in 1939 along with two additional Simon Carves multi-drum boiler units each evaporating 125,000 lb/hr.

By 1963-64, the A station had 2 × 30 MW generators. The steam capacity of the boilers was 1,014,000 lb/hr (127.8 kg/s). Steam conditions at the turbine stop valves was 200/370 psi (13.8/25.5 bar) and 282/416 °C. The boilers were chain grate stoked. In 1963-64 the overall thermal efficiency of the A station was 14.55 per cent.

Hackney B

The British Electricity Authority decided in 1949 that additional generating capacity was need at the site. It was originally planned as a 2 x 30MW station but was later expended by a third unit. A further extension into the footprint of the demolished A station but was never undertake. The first two turbo alternators were online by 1955 and the third set in December 1957. Coal continued to be delivered by barge to the site and despite the cramped site 50,000 Tonnes could be stored. Steam was generated initially from three pulverised fuel Simon and Carves boilers of 300,000 lb/hr feeding 2 × 33 MW Parsons and 1 × 30 MW Parsons 6.6 kV generators. Steam conditions at the turbine stop valves was 600 psi (41.4 bar) and 464 °C. Instead of cooling towers a mechanically induced draught type wooden cooling tower was used with eight induced draught fans being on the top of the tower. The overall dimensions of the tower are 289ft long, 37ft wide and 31ft high with a capacity of 2.25 million gallons per hour (2.84 m3/s), make-up water was from the River Lea.

In 1963-64 the overall thermal efficiency of the A station was 25.48 per cent.

Electricity output from Hackney power station was as follows.

Hackney A annual electricity output GWh
Hackney B annual electricity output GWh
