= Fawley Tunnel =

Power cable tunnel in Hampshire, England

Coordinates: 50.826°N 1.314°W

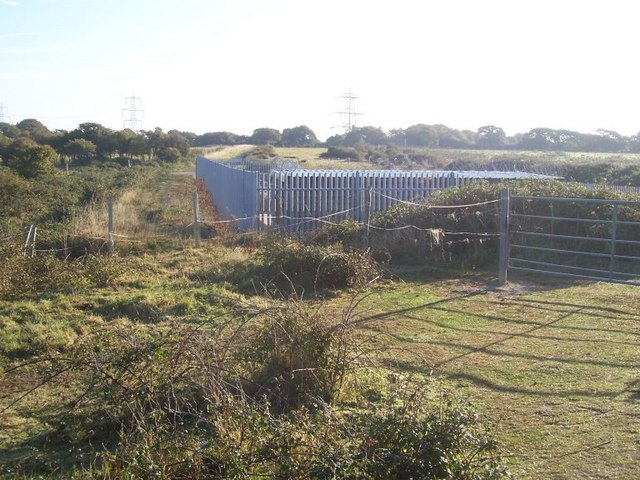
A fenced-off entrance to the tunnel

Fawley Tunnel, or Fawley transmission tunnel, is a 3-metre (9.8 ft) diameter, 2-mile (3.2 km) long tunnel under Southampton Water between Fawley Power Station and Chilling near Warsash. It carries the cables of two 400kV circuits of the National Grid.

== Background ==
Fawley power station on the west side of Southampton Water was located to utilise fuel oil available from the adjacent oil refinery. When the power station was being planned in the mid-1960s the question arose of connecting the station to the national grid. A connection to the 400 kV sub-station at Lovedean some 10 miles to the north east was the ideal location. From Lovedean the 400 kV line runs east along the South Coast. There were three options for the Fawley to Lovedean line. Firstly, to route overhead lines west from Fawley then around Millbrook to the north of Southampton. This was rejected on grounds of routing and amenity. Secondly, overhead lines across Southampton Water. This was feasible but the towers would be higher than any in the UK. The third option was to construct a two-mile underground tunnel beneath Southampton Water. This was the shortest route and the best for amenity reasons. This was the chosen option although it is estimated to have cost about £3 million (1969 prices).

== Construction ==
The tunnel was constructed by Taylor Woodrow Construction. The tunnel is 100 feet below sea level, the seabed is 12.5 metres above the tunnel. It was constructed between 1962 and 1965 to carry two 400 kV circuits as part of the National Grid. The tunnel was accessed by two shafts, the west shaft at Fawley is 37.5 m deep, the east shaft at Chilling is 21.9 m deep. The tunnel was excavated under a pressure of 35 psi to prevent water ingress and is lined with cast iron segments. The cables are oil filled and were installed by Pirelli Construction in 1966. The tunnel was built with a 3 feet 1.125 inch gauge railway to help with maintenance access. The railway was operated with a single battery powered locomotive that was scrapped in the late 70s.

== Operation ==
Fawley tunnel was the first system to use forced cooling of 400 kV cables. Cables were laid in triangular configuration in an open duct through which water flowed under gravity from one end of the tunnel to the other.

== See also ==
- Fawley Power Station
- River Medway cable tunnels
- Thames cable tunnel
- Severn-Wye Cable Tunnel
