= Severn-Wye Cable Tunnel =

British cable tunnel

Location
- Country: UK
- Coordinates: 51.608459°N 2.615454°W
- General direction: East-West
- From: Newhouse, Monmouthshire
- To: Aust, South Gloucestershire

Ownership information
- Owner: Central Electricity Generating Board (1972-90), National Grid plc (from 1990)
- Operator: Central Electricity Generating Board (1972-90), National Grid plc (from 1990)

Construction information
- Cable manufacturer: British Insulated Callender's Cables Ltd.
- Cable installer: BICC
- Contractors: Charles Brand and Sons Limited
- Construction started: 1970-73
- Construction cost: £3.5 million (1971 price)

Technical information
- Type: 3.1 metre diameter underground tunnel
- Current type: 3-phase AC 50 Hz
- Total length: 3.6 km (2.2 mi)
- Capacity: 2,600 MVA each circuit
- AC voltage: 400 kV
- No. of circuits: 2

The Severn-Wye Cable Tunnel, also known as the Severn Cable Tunnel, carries high-voltage (400 kV) electricity transmission lines beneath the estuaries of the River Severn and River Wye between Newhouse (Mathern), Monmouthshire and Aust, South Gloucestershire.

== History ==
To exploit the generating capacity of new power stations being built in the late 1960s at Pembroke (2,000 MW) and Aberthaw ('A' 600 MW, 'B' 1,400 MW), the Central Electricity Generating Board (CEGB) planned to construct 400 kV supergrid lines through South Wales and Gloucestershire to National Grid connection points at Gloucester and Melksham, Wiltshire. The CEGB intended the line to Melksham substation to cross the River Severn at Sharpness using overhead cables. A public inquiry was held in 1967 and objections were raised by the Council for the Preservation of Rural England and several District and Parish Councils. The principal objection was to the impact of the power lines on the scenery of the Cotswolds and of the Vale of Berkeley. Following the inquiry the CEGB was directed by the Minister of Power to plan a more southerly route. The amended route across the Severn was 11 miles downstream from Sharpness, and close to the existing overhead crossing at Aust, but using a tunnel instead of overhead lines. The additional cost of tunneling was estimated to be about £4 million.

== Specification ==
The Severn-Wye Cable Tunnel carries two 400 kV electricity circuits on the transmission line between the National Grid 400 kV substations at Whitson and Melksham. Each circuit has a rating of 2,600 MVA. The tunnel is 3.1 m (10 ft) in diameter, is 3.6 km (2.25 miles) long, and has a maximum depth of 48.8 m (160 ft). The two principal access shafts are on the East bank of the Severn at Aust, South Gloucestershire (51.608459°N 2.615454°W) and on the West bank of the Wye at Newhouse (Mathern), Monmouthshire, (51.610878°N 2.669090°W) where each of the two cable sealing end compounds are located. There is also an intermediate access shaft at Beachley, Gloucestershire (51.609761°N 2.652498°W).

== Construction ==
The tunnel was engineered by Charles Haswell and Partners and constructed by Charles Brand and Sons Ltd. It was built using three access shafts: at Aust (at a depth of 47.9 m), at Beachley (48.5 m deep) and at Newhouse (34.7 m deep); two tunnel boring machines were used. In December 1970 the machines were boring at a rate of 9.1–15.2 m per week but this increased to 46 m per week in 1971. Difficulties were encountered with the ingress of water from the natural springs in the geology of the area.

The civil engineering work cost about £2 million and the electrical installation an additional £1.5 million (1970 prices). The cables were manufactured and installed by British Insulated Callender’s Cables Ltd.

In April 1972 a lift at the Aust construction shaft failed and fell 30 m (100 ft), injuring four men.

== Operation ==
Each of the six cables in the tunnel is installed within a PVC pipe though which cooling water is pumped. The circulating water is cooled in air/water heat exchangers. At full power (2,600 MVA for each circuit) the cable joints are cooled by circulating oil through the hollow conductors. Water ingress into the tunnel is managed by a pumping system. Initially pumping took place at both ends of the tunnel, but in about 2005 this was reduced to pumping at the Aust end only. There are four 18.5 kW rotary lobe pumps manufactured by Börger. Each pump has a capacity of 40 m^{3} per hour at a discharge head of 70 m. Normally only two pumps are in operation but if the ingress of water increases all four pumps automatically operate.

A powered trolley to move equipment, and in an emergency injured personnel, is provided in the tunnel.

== See also ==
- Aust Severn Powerline Crossing
- Thames Cable Tunnel
- River Medway Cable Tunnels
- Fawley Tunnel
