= Brechfa Forest Wind Farm =

Wind farm in Carmarthenshire, Wales

Brechfa Forest West Wind Farm
- Country: Wales, United Kingdom
- Location: 10 km NE of Carmarthen
- Coordinates: 51°59′00″N 04°09′50″W
- Status: Operational
- Construction began: November 2016
- Owner: Welsh Assembly Government
- Operator: innogy Renewables UK

Power generation
- Units operational: 28
- Nameplate capacity: 57.4 MW

External links
- Website: uk.rwe.com/rwe-in-wales/

Brechfa Forest West Wind Farm is a wind farm in Brechfa Forest in Carmarthenshire in south west Wales. Construction of the wind farm began in November 2016 and power generation commenced in January 2018.

== Planning ==
Innogy Renewables UK Ltd. proposed that the wind farm would be built in Strategic Search Area G, created as part of the Welsh Government's TAN 8 policy, published in 2005. Brechfa Forest West Wind Farm, had a proposed capacity of greater than 50 MW; thus the application was submitted to the Infrastructure Planning Commission.

The Brechfa Forest West development, located near the Afon Pib valley, consists of 28 turbines with a maximum tip height of 145 metres. The turbines have a generating capacity of around 57.4 MW. The plans were opposed by local activists.

As the Infrastructure Planning Commission ceased to exist in April 2012, the Brechfa Forest West application fell to the National Infrastructure Planning section of the Planning Inspectorate to produce a recommendation for the Secretary of State at DECC. They recommended approval, and DECC confirmed that development consent for Brechfa Forest West was granted on 12 March 2013.

Carmarthenshire County Council Planning Committee approved the planning application for Brechfa Forest East at their 17 December 2013 meeting.

== Construction ==
Construction on the Brechfa Forest West wind farm started in November 2016, and all turbines were operational in June 2018.

== See also ==
- Infrastructure Planning Commission
- Planning Inspectorate
