= River Medway Cable Tunnels =

Undersea cables in Kent, UK

Location
- Country: UK
- Coordinates: 51°26'09.4"N 0°42'18.9"E
- From: Isle of Grain
- To: Chetney Marsh

Ownership information
- Owner: Central Electricity Generating Board (1967-90), National Grid plc (from 1990)
- Operator: CEGB (1976-90), National Grid plc (from 1990)

Construction information
- Contractors: John Mowlem & Co. Ltd.
- Construction started: 1973-6

Technical information
- Type: 2.54 m diameter underground tunnel
- Current type: AC
- Total length: 1.7 km (1.1 mi)
- Capacity: 3780 A
- AC voltage: 400 kV
- No. of circuits: 1 in each tunnel

The River Medway Cable Tunnels are a pair of tunnels carrying high-voltage electricity transmission lines beneath the lower River Medway between the Isle of Grain and Chetney Marshes, Kent.

== Specification ==
Each tunnel carries a 400 kV electricity circuit on the transmission line between the National Grid substations at Grain and Kemsley (Line Reference: 4TL). The oil-filled cables are designed to carry 3780 Amps in Winter and 3060 A in Summer. The tunnels are 1,700 metres long, 2.54 m in diameter and between 34 m and 47 m below ordnance datum. The tunnels are connected to a common 6.1 m diameter vertical access shaft at each end.

Grain sealing end compound location: 51°26'09.4"N 0°42'18.9"E

Chetney Marsh sealing end compound location: 51°25'14.6"N 0°41'59.6"E

== Design and construction ==
The tunnels were built in anticipation of the commissioning of Grain power station (with a planned capacity of 3,300 MW). The crossing would allow the transmission of power to the 400 kV transmission system to the south. A feasibility report of 1967 addressed both overhead line and tunnel options for the crossing. Overhead lines would have been longer than the 1,382 metre Swanscombe to Thurrock 400kV crossing and therefore require taller pylons. The tunnels were designed by the Transmission Development and Construction Division of the Central Electricity Generating Board advised by Charles Haswell and Partners. They were constructed between 1973–6 by John Mowlem & Co. Ltd. and L.G. Mouchel and Partners were consulting engineers for the civil engineering work. The tunnels are constructed from concrete expanding wedge block linings. The tunnels were designed to be constructed through a layer of London Clay. Unexpected beds of gravel and silt were encountered and entailed a diversion of the west tunnel.

== Operation ==
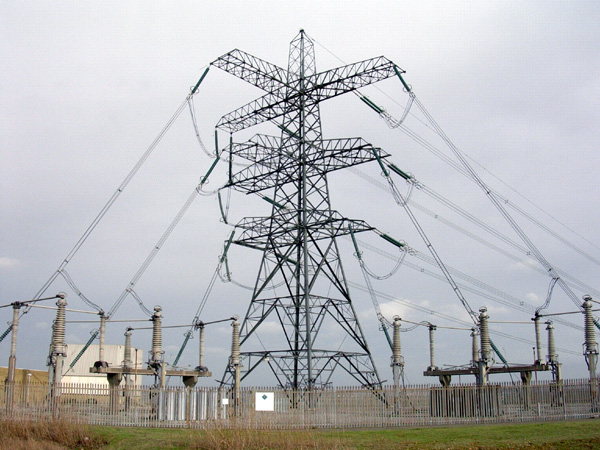
Medway Cable Tunnel south pylon

The cables are air cooled to maintain the temperature within design limits at high electricity loads. A forced ventilation system, comprising fans, dampers, acoustic enclosures, and control systems delivers 58 m^{3}/s of air at 7,500 Pa through each tunnel. The tunnels are provided with Distributed Temperature Sensing fibre system mounted in the crown of each tunnel to detect abnormal temperature conditions.

== See also ==
- Thames Cable Tunnel
- Dartford Cable Tunnel
- 400 kV Thames Crossing
