= Dartford Cable Tunnel =

Tunnel under the river Thames in London, England

Location
- Country: UK
- Coordinates: 51°28′5″N 0°14′58″E

Ownership information
- Owner: National Grid plc

Construction information
- Commissioned: 2004

Technical information
- Type: Underground tunnel
- Current type: AC
- AC voltage: 400 kV

The Dartford Cable Tunnel is a 2.4 km utility tunnel beneath the Thames, upstream of the Dartford Crossing. With a diameter of ~3 m (10 ft), it carries a 400 kV National Grid electrical transmission cable. It is accessible by foot as a crossing of the Thames, but by authorised personnel only. It was built in 2003–04 at a cost of £11 million (equivalent to £20 million in 2025). The tunnel plays a crucial role in maintaining electrical supply infrastructure beneath the Thames, ensuring reliable power transmission.

== See also ==
- 400 kV Thames Crossing
- Thames Cable Tunnel
- Utility vault
- Crossings of the River Thames
- Tunnels underneath the River Thames
