= Thames Cable Tunnel =

Electric power infrastructure in England

Coordinates: 51.448°N 0.399°E

Location
- Country: UK

Ownership information
- Owner: National Grid plc

Construction information
- Commissioned: 1970

Technical information
- Type: Underground tunnel
- Current type: AC
- AC voltage: 400 kV

The Thames Cable Tunnel, also known as the Tilbury – Gravesend Cable Tunnel, is a tunnel carrying high-voltage electrical transmission lines beneath the lower River Thames between Tilbury and Gravesend. It remains the furthest tunnel downstream on the Thames.

Completed in 1970 at a cost of around £3 million (equivalent to £41 million in 2025) by the Central Electricity Generating Board, the tunnel carries 400 kV transmission cables between substations at Tilbury and Kingsnorth as part of the National Grid. The tunnel is approximately 45 metres (148 ft) deep, and was one of the first tunnels in the UK to be lined with pre-cast concrete segments rather than cast iron. A tunnel was chosen due to the high costs of building an overhead transmission line at this point in the river.

In September 2023, National Grid announced that they were planning to retire the Thames Cable Tunnel, as it was approaching the end of its useful life. The Grain to Tilbury project aims to construct a new tunnel to replace it.

== See also ==
- 400 kV Thames Crossing
- Dartford Cable Tunnel
