= List of places in Clackmannanshire =

List of settlements in Clackmannanshire area

The article is a list of links for any town, village and hamlet in the Clackmannanshire council area of Scotland.

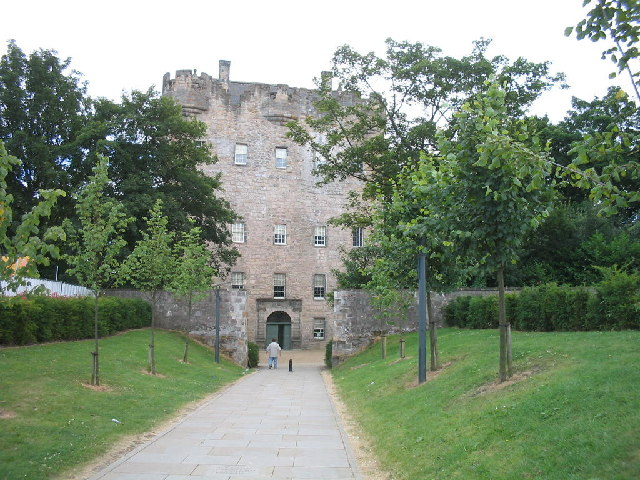
Alloa Tower

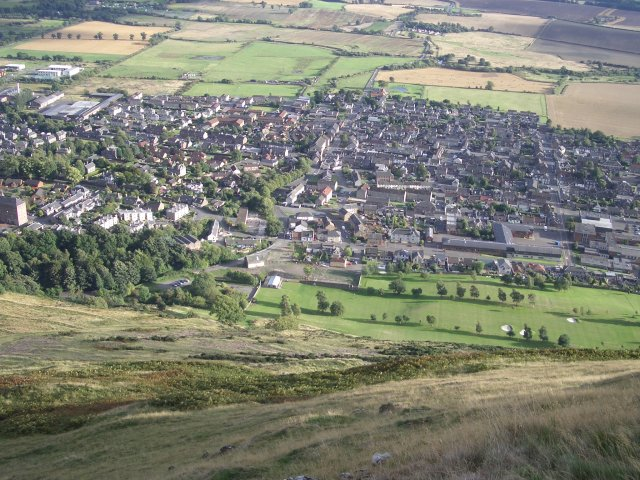
Alva

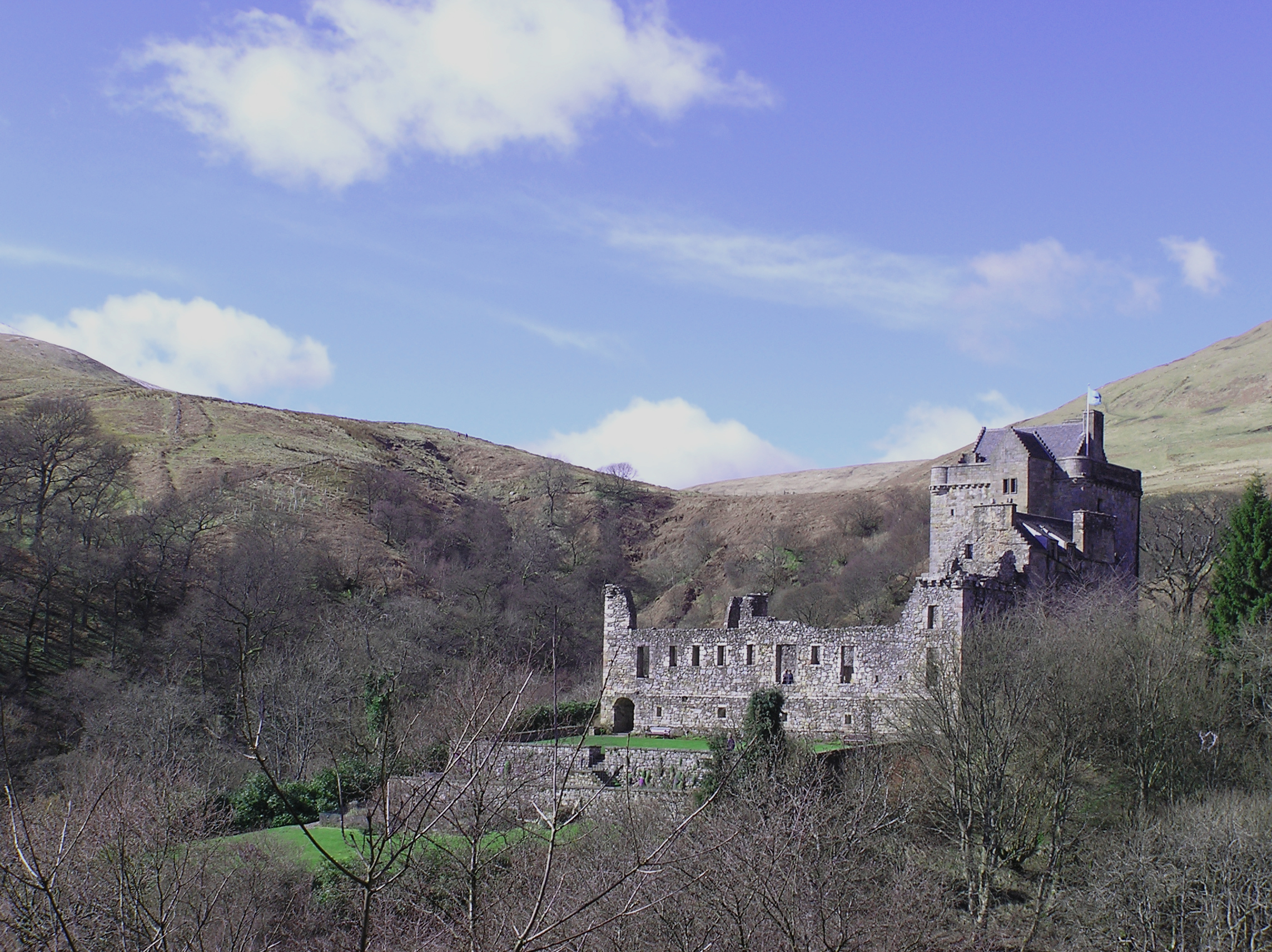
Castle Campbell

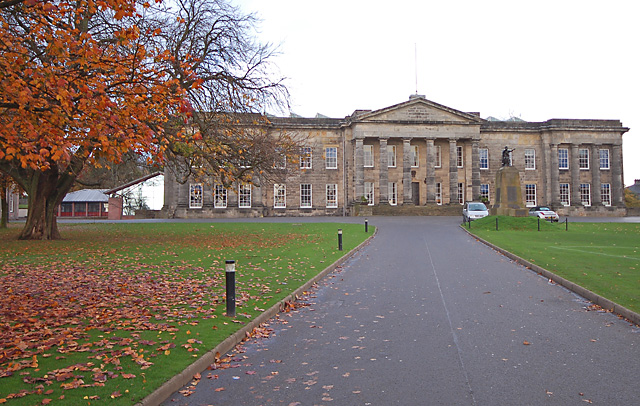
Dollar Academy

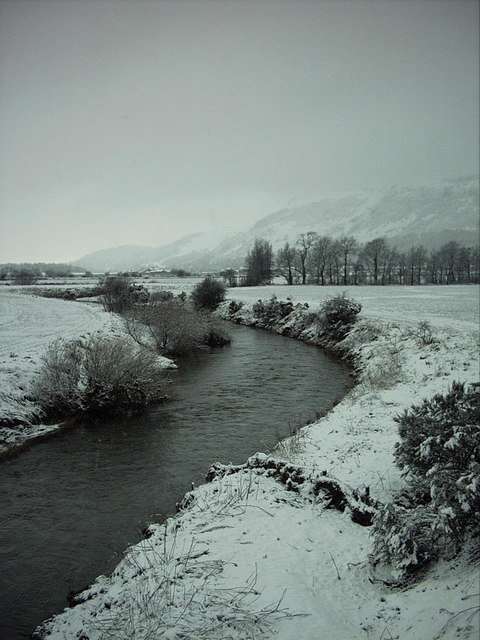
River Devon

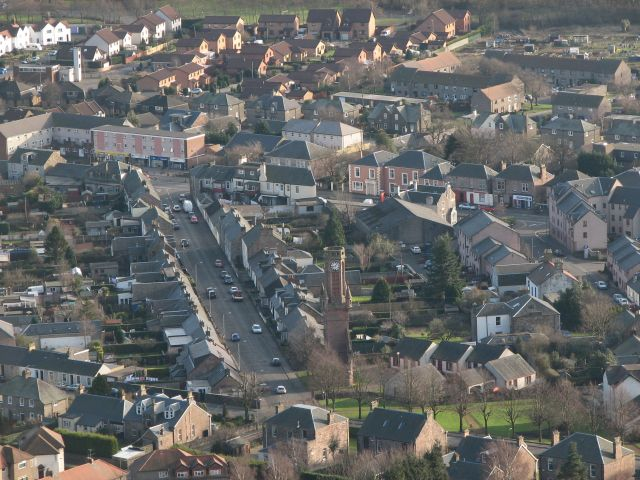
Tillicoultry

== A ==
- Alloa, Alloa railway station, Alloa Tower
- Alloa Inch
- Alva, Alva railway station

== B ==
- Black Devon
- Broomhall Castle
- Brucefield House

== C ==
- Cambus
- Castle Campbell
- Clackmannan, Clackmannan Tower
- Coalsnaughton
- Clackmannan House

== D ==
- Devonside
- Dollar
- Dollarbeg
- Dumyat

== F ==
- Fishcross
- Forestmill, Forest Mill railway station

== G ==
- Gean House
- Glenochil

== H ==
- Harviestoun, Harviestoun Brewery
- Helensfield

== I ==
- Inglewood

== K ==
- Kennet

== M ==
- Menstrie, Menstrie Castle, Menstrie Glen
- Muckhart
- Myreton Hill

== O ==
- Ochil Hills

== P ==
- Pool of Muckhart

== R ==
- Recreation Park
- River Devon
- River Forth

== S ==
- Sauchie, Sauchie Tower
- Strathdevon

== T ==
- Tillicoultry
- Tullibody, Tullibody Inch, Tullibody Old Kirk

== See also ==
- List of places in Scotland
