= List of valleys of Scotland =

Below is a list of glens in Scotland. In Scotland, valleys are often known as "glens". In total, the country has over 40 glens with rich history, with some of the glens in Scotland historically being ruled by warlike clans who defended the territory from invasion. The majority of the Scotland's glens are located in the Highland area of the country, with areas such as Glen Trool, Glencoe, "The Great Glen", Glen Etive and Glen Lyon being the most visited.

== By council area ==
=== Argyll and Bute ===
- Glen Croe
- Glen Douglas
- Glen Fruin
- Glen Orchy
- Glen Shira
- Great Glen
- Hell's Glen
- Strath Fillan

=== Scottish Borders ===
- Yarrow, Scottish Borders
- Liddesdale

=== Clackmannanshire ===
- Menstrie Glen
- Strathdevon

=== Highland ===
- Gleann Dubh Lighe
- Glen Affric
- Glen Brittle
- Glen Cannich
- Glen Coe
- Glen Docherty
- Glen Etive
- Glen Finnan
- Glen Kingie
- Glen Loy
- Glen Nevis
- Glen Shiel
- Glen Strathfarrar
- Glen Urquhart
- Glenmoriston
- Great Glen
- River Dionard
- Strath Halladale
- Strath of Kildonan
- Stratherrick
- Strathglass
- Strathmore
- Strathnairn
- Strathnaver
- Strathrusdale
- Strathspey
- Strathy

=== Inverclyde ===
- Spango Valley

=== Perth and Kinross ===
- Glen Artney
- Glen Lyon
- Glen Quaich
- Glen Shee
- Glen Tilt
- Glenalmond
- Gleneagles
- Strathallan
- Strathearn
- Valley of Strathmore

=== Stirling ===
- Finnich Glen
- Glen Dochart
- Glen Finglas
- Glen Lochay
- Glen Ogle
- Lochan Saorach
- Menstrie Glen
- Strath Fillan
- Strathallan

== See also ==
- Geography of Scotland
- Environment of Scotland
