= Alva Academy =

Coordinates: 56°09′16″N 3°48′14″W

Location
- Academy Avenue; Alva, Clackmannanshire, FK12 5FE; Scotland

Information
- Type: State Comprehensive
- Motto: "Acer in Ludo Ludisque"
- Religious affiliation: non-religious
- Head Teacher: Scott McEwan
- Age: 11 to 18
- Enrolment: 848
- Houses: Cleuch, Law, Torry, Dumyat and Nebit
- Colours: Black and white
- Website: alvaacademy.com

Alva Academy is a six-year comprehensive school serving the towns and villages of Alva, Menstrie, Tillicoultry, Coalsnaughton, Devonside, Dollar and Muckhart, all in Clackmannanshire, Scotland. The roll is over 900. It has six associated primaries - Alva, Menstrie, Tillicoultry, Coalsnaughton, Strathdevon and Muckhart.

== History ==
The original Alva Academy was established in the 1860s by public subscriptions from residents of the town to overcome the shortcomings of educational provision. Educational change and a constantly rising school roll forced regular change to meet growing demands. The advent of comprehensive education in 1967/68 saw the linking of Tillicoultry and Alva Schools into a six-year comprehensive.

Following a Clackmannanshire Council decision in 1997 to integrate pupils with Moderate Learning Difficulties into a mainstream secondary school, Alva Academy was chosen as the location for this development. MLD pupils in S3 to S6 experience a full and varied curriculum which is integrated with mainstream subjects at appropriate levels.

== Notable former pupils ==
- Adam Ashe - Rugby union coach and former player for Glasgow Warriors and Scotland
- Jamie Bhatti - Rugby union player for Glasgow Warriors and Scotland
- Robert Curran (Scottish politician) - who was youngest Provost in Scotland, and the first SNP provost
- Megan Kennedy - Rugby player for Stirling County RFC and Scotland women's national rugby union team
- Callumn Morrison - Professional footballer
- Shona Robison - politician, who has served as Cabinet Secretary for Finance and Local Government
- Ronnie (George) Woodward - Reform UK candidate and Leader of the Council for Newton le Willows - East
- Findlay Currie - Assurance engineer and badminton player
- Kirsty Mack - First Scottish female mountaineer to summit K2 and Scouts volunteer

== Notable former staff ==
- Gregor Abel Former professional footballer and manager

== Sources ==
- Alva Academy
- Alva Academy's page on Scottish Schools Online
