= Caroline Elizabeth Mary (Carrie) Johnstone =

Scottish philanthropist

Caroline Johnstone
- Born: 25 July 1849; Alva, Scotland, British Empire
- Died: 4 July 1929 (aged 79)
- Known for: Philanthropy and public speaking

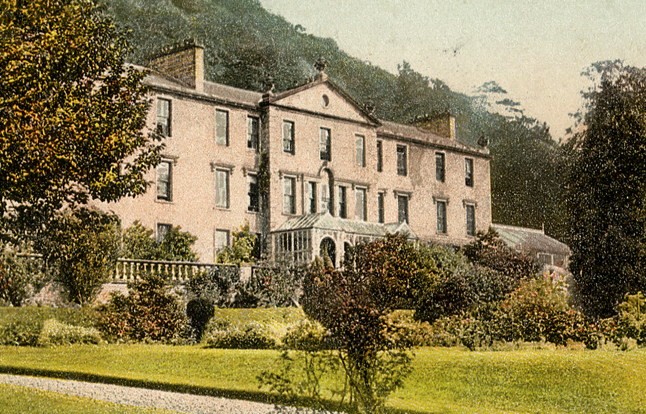
Alva House, Alva Clackmannanshire, Scotland

Caroline Elizabeth Mary (Carrie) Johnstone (25 July 1849 – 4 July 1929) was a prominent Scottish philanthropist and public speaker.

== Biography ==
Johnstone was born in Alva, Clackmannanshire on 25 July 1849. She was born into a local prominent family living at Alva House and she became known as a generous local benefactor.

Her spending resulted in the decline and eventual dilapidation of her family home. After Alva House, she moved to Myretoun House where she lived with her companion of many years, Miss L’Estrange.

Typical of philanthropic middle-class women in the late 19th century, Johnstone was involved in many national and local charities, including serving as President of the Scottish Domestic Servants’ Benevolent Association and working with the Alva Mothers’ Union and Child Welfare Society. A gifted public speaker, she was President of the Alva Women’s Unionist Association and a member of the Clackmannanshire Central Committee for Maternal and Child Welfare. She also took a close personal interest in local families’ welfare.

== Death ==
Johnstone died in Alva on 4 July 1929. A fountain was erected in her memory in 1951 in Johnstone Park (the park was a gift to the town from her father).
