= Battle of Sheriffmuir =

1715 battle of the Jacobite rising of 1715

- Part of the Jacobite rising of 1715
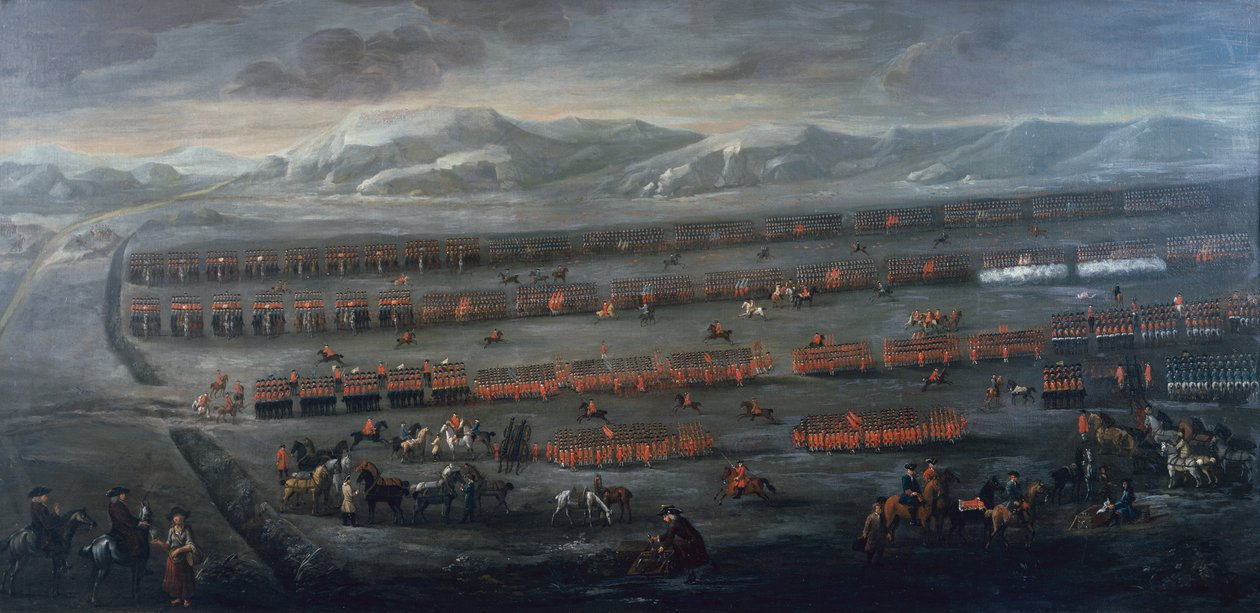
- Painting of the battle by John Wootton
Date	13 November 1715
Location	Sheriffmuir, Scotland 56.19524°N 3.91011°W
Result	Inconclusive

Belligerents
Great Britain	Jacobites

Commanders and leaders
Duke of Argyll	Earl of Mar

Strength
6,000	12,000

Casualties and losses
663 killed, wounded or captured	200–800 killed, wounded or captured

Registered battlefield
- Designated: 21 March 2011
- Reference no.: BTL17
- Location within Scotland

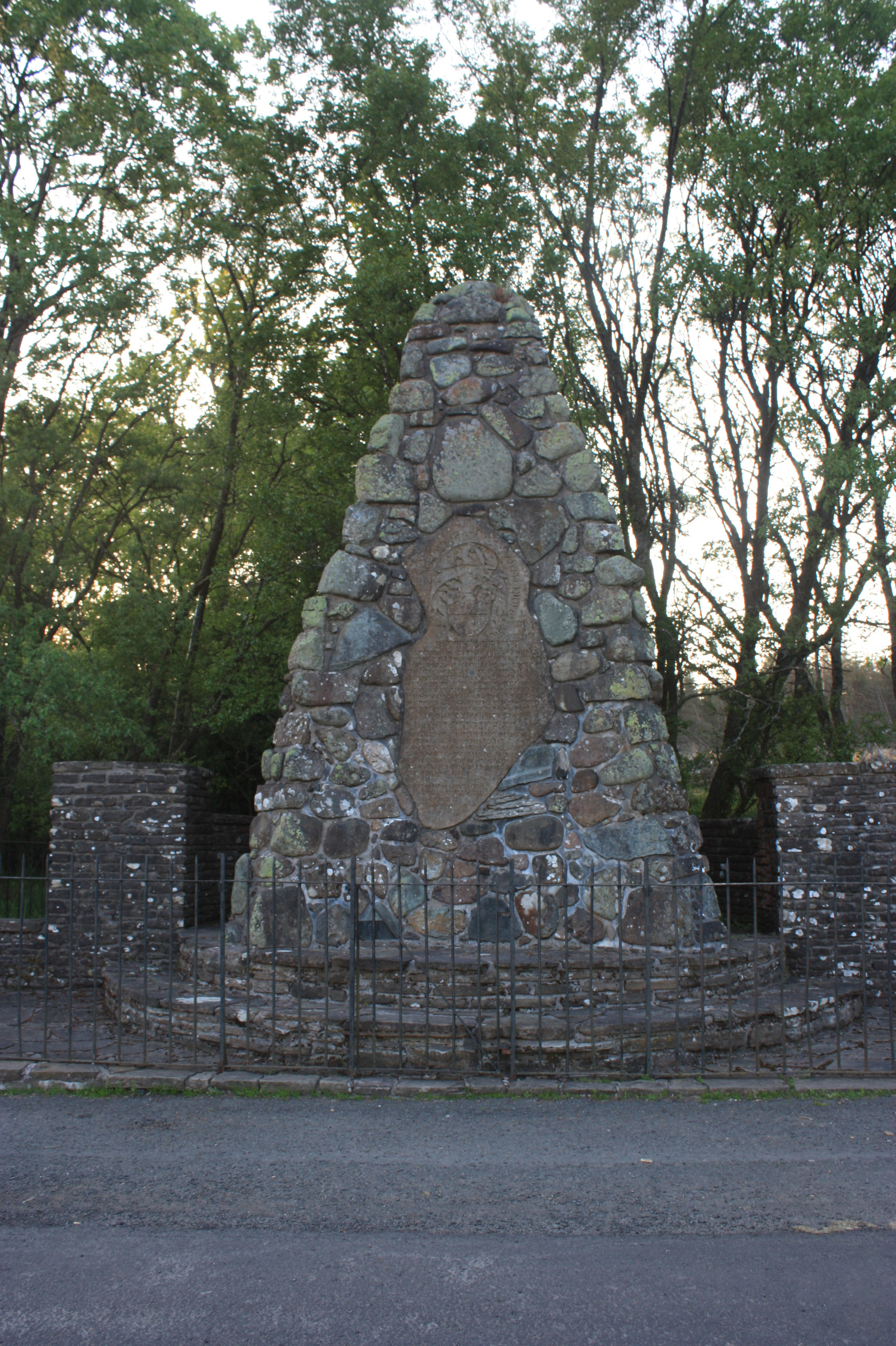
Monument to Clan MacRae, Sheriffmuir

The Battle of Sheriffmuir (Scottish Gaelic: Blàr Sliabh an t-Siorraim, [pl̪ˠaɾ ˈʃʎiəv əɲ ˈtʲʰirˠəm]) was an engagement in 1715 at the height of the Jacobite rising in Scotland. The battlefield has been included in the Inventory of Historic Battlefields in Scotland and protected by Historic Scotland under the Scottish Historical Environment Policy of 2009. Sheriffmuir is a remote elevated plateau of moorland lying between Stirling and Auchterarder on the north fringe of the Ochil Hills.

== Background ==
John Erskine, 6th Earl of Mar, standard-bearer for the Jacobite cause in Scotland, mustered Highland chiefs, and, on 6 September, declared James Francis Edward Stuart (the "Old Pretender") as King of Scots. With an army of about 12,000 men Mar proceeded to take Perth, and commanded much of the northern Highlands. Following unsuccessful skirmishes against John Campbell, 2nd Duke of Argyll (based at Stirling), Mar was eventually persuaded to lead his full army south, on 10 November. Spies informed Argyll of Mar's actions, and he moved his army of about 4,000 to Sheriffmuir, near Dunblane. The two armies met on the battlefield on 13 November 1715.

== Battle ==
Argyll was seriously outnumbered by the Jacobite army (which was somewhat diminished from its previous numbers), and his left wing, commanded by General Thomas Whetham, was far shorter than the Jacobites' opposing right. Argyll's right wing attacked, and managed to drive the Highlanders back, but Whetham's soldiers were overpowered by a much larger force. Argyll came to the aid of Whetham's men. By evening, both armies were seriously reduced, and although Mar had a great advantage in numbers, he refused to risk the entirety of his army, allowing Argyll to withdraw.

The battle was inconclusive, with both sides claiming victory. However, in strategic terms Argyll had halted the Jacobite advance. Those government regiments present during the battle that were titled 'King's' were awarded the White Horse of Hanover as a badge of honour. The engagement only served to demoralize the Jacobite army who, with their superior numbers, felt they should have decisively won. Mar's French and Spanish supporters in particular withdrew their forces.

== Aftermath ==
The modern Scottish archaeologist and TV commentator Neil Oliver states that in hindsight the Jacobite failure of the rising of 1715 seems astonishing in that the Jacobite leader, the Earl of Mar, could easily have moved past the Duke of Argyll to link up with the English Jacobites and Catholics in the north of England, had he had the merest sense of how to fight a campaign rather than lead a parade.

On 23 December, the Old Pretender, who had been exiled in France, landed at Peterhead, his cause largely lost. He met with Mar at Perth, but was unable to rouse the disheartened army. Argyll, reinforced and invigorated, soon advanced north, while the Jacobite army fled to Montrose, and the Pretender returned to France. The army moved to Ruthven, and dispersed.

The period was fatal in the extreme to the Jacobite Pretender. The whole body of his adherents in the south had fallen into the hands of generals Willis and Carpenter at Preston, and Inverness, with all the adjacent country, had been recovered to the government, through the exertions of pro-government clans including the Earl of Sutherland, Fraser Lord Lovat, the Rosses, the Munros and the Forbeses.

== Casualties ==
The number killed, wounded, or captured on the side of the Jacobites has been stated to have been between two hundred and eight hundred, among whom were John Lyon, 5th Earl of Strathmore and Kinghorne, his uncle Patrick Lyon of Auchterhouse, and the chief of the Clan Ranald of Clan MacDonald. Several others of distinction. James Maule, 4th Earl of Panmure, and William Drummond of Logiealmond were among the wounded. It meant that the Jacobite army had to withdraw to Perth. Argyll considered himself the victor and struck a medal to commemorate his feat.

Of the government army, there were killed, and wounded, upwards of six hundred. Archibald Douglas, 2nd Earl of Forfar, was the only person of eminence killed on that side.

A famous Jacobite song, "Sheriffmuir fight", was written about the battle. As with many such songs, the battle is presented as a noble victory for the Jacobite army. The song was collected by, and perhaps written by, James Hogg in 1819.

== Robert Burns and "The Battle of Sherramuir" ==
The Battle was the subject of "The Battle of Sherramuir", one of the most famous songs written by Robert Burns. The song was written when Burns toured the Highlands in 1787 and was first published in the Scots Musical Museum, appearing in volume III, 1790. It was written to be sung to the "Cameronian Rant".

Burns knew that the battle ended so inconclusively that it was unclear which side had won and the poem is the account of the battle by two shepherds taking contrary views. One of the shepherds believes that "the red-coat lads wi' black cockades" routed the rebels, painting a fearful picture of how they managed to "hough the Clans like nine-pin kyles". The other shepherd is just as convinced that the Jacobites "did pursue / The horsemen back to Forth, man" with the eventual result that "... mony a huntit, poor Red-coat / For fear amaist did swarf, man."

Dissatisfied with the first published version of the poem, Burns re-wrote it sometime after 1790. The revised version was published after Burns' death by his editor, James Currie MD in The Complete Poetical Works of Robert Burns: With Explanatory and Glossarial Notes; And a Life of the Author (1800).

== Sources ==
- Smurthwaite, David, Ordnance Survey Complete Guide to the Battlefields of Britain, Webb & Bower Ltd., 1984
- Mileham, Patrick (2000), Difficulties Be Damned: The King's Regiment - A History of the City Regiment of Manchester and Liverpool, Fleur de Lys ISBN 1-873907-10-9
- Robinson, Roger E. R. (1988). The Bloody Eleventh: History of the Devonshire Regiment. Volume I: 1685–1815. Exteter: The Devon and Dorset Regiment. ISBN 0-9512655-0-4.
