= Hillfoots Villages =

The Hillfoots Villages are the villages and small towns which lie at the base of the southern scarp face of the Ochil Hills, formed by the Ochil Fault, in Stirlingshire and Clackmannanshire in central Scotland.

From west to east the communities are Blairlogie, Menstrie, Alva, Tillicoultry, Devonside, Coalsnaughton, Dollar and Muckhart.
