= Menstrie Glen =

Coordinates: 56.158°N 3.857°W

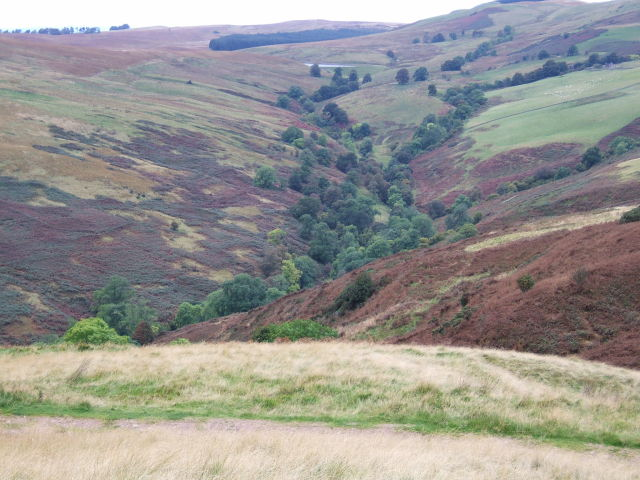
Upper Menstrie Glen from NS853981 looking WNW

Menstrie Glen is the glen which separates Dumyat from Myreton Hill and the main body of the Ochil Hills in Scotland. Once farmed but no longer inhabited, it is now used for sheep pasture, a public water supply and recreation in the form of fishing and walking. A plan is under consideration (autumn 2014) for commercial forestry on the eastern and northern flanks of the glen.

== Vegetation and topography ==
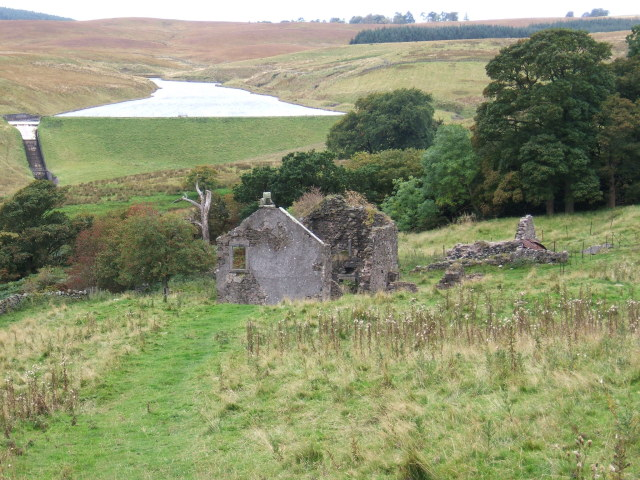
Jerah and the Lossburn Reservoir looking west

Much of the area of the glen is rough pasture where sheep graze. Bracken is also abundant while broad-leaved trees grow in the deeply cut burnsides and in the vicinity of abandoned settlements.

The bed of the glen ranges in altitude from 228m, at the saddle at UK Grid reference NN819002, to about 20m where it emerges onto the flood plain in Menstrie at NS849970.

Near its upper (west) end, the glen contains the Lossburn Reservoir which holds drinking water and is used for recreational fishing. The reservoir accepts water from the north-western slopes of Dumyat and from the south-western slopes of Loss Hill. An earth embankment seemingly designed to divert compensation water around the north side of the reservoir has been breached so the Menstrie Burn relies for its flow mainly on the streams entering the watercourse below the dam.

Below the reservoir, the Loss Burn is joined by the Crunie Burn to form the Menstrie Burn. This, in turn, is augmented by the Third, Second and First Inchna Burns (in the order in which they join) and which drain the southwestern slopes of Colsnaur Hill. The Second Inchna Burn and part of the Menstrie Burn downstream lie along the boundary between Stirlingshire (to the west) and Clackmannanshire.

== History ==
The history of settlement and land-use from 1450 to the mid-20th century has been published.

In medieval times, much of Menstrie Glen was Crown land and used mainly to pasture sheep.

The Campbells of Argyll had come into possession of the land east of the Menstrie Burn by the early 14th century and, up to at least 1530, the lands of Jerah were controlled by the Cistercians of Culross.

In the 18th century ownership of the glen passed to local lairds. Farmsteads, of which there were then more than a dozen, were operated by the lairds' tenants. In the mid-18th Century James Wright, laird of Loss, owned about half of the glen until his death in 1770. He left voluminous notes and paperwork describing his practices and agricultural improvements. Thereafter John Robb of Jerah leased much of the land and by the early nineteenth century his grandson Alexander controlled most of the glen. The smaller farmtouns were combined into larger landholdings controlled from a base at Loss and later Jerah. These included Callendar, Whitttetsbank (lease terminated in 1763), Longcraig (lease terminated in 1793) and Ploverburn which merged with Ashentrool in 1762.

In the early 19th century arable farming and pasture were still carried on at the remaining farmsteads of Ashentrool, Loss and Jerah, but Ashentrool had been abandoned by the first census in 1841 and Loss by the second in 1851.

The remnant of Loss farmstead is described in detail by The Royal Commission on the Ancient and Historical Monuments of Scotland (RCAHMS).

RCAMHS have also published a description and aerial photographs of the remains of Ashentrool, also known as Lossintrule or Loss Hill.

Jerah or Meikle Jerah, at NS838991 near the top of the glen and once accessible by road from the Sheriffmuir (western) side, was farmed by the Alexanders in the late seventeenth century. It passed to the Rob, later Robb, family in the early eighteenth century. In the 1820s Alexander Robb moved to Mains of Menstrie and Jerah was tenanted by Peter Gentle, husband of Alexander's sister Helen Robb, and then by their son Andrew Gentle (d.1866). The farmhouse was rebuilt in the mid C19th and was inhabited up until the 1960s. It has since fallen into ruin with only the gables surviving to their full height. Little Jerah to the east was tenanted by the Hendersons in the seventeenth century, later passing to the Cairns family. It was the birthplace of Rev Christopher Cairns (1703-61). The glen is now uninhabited.

== Access and recreation ==
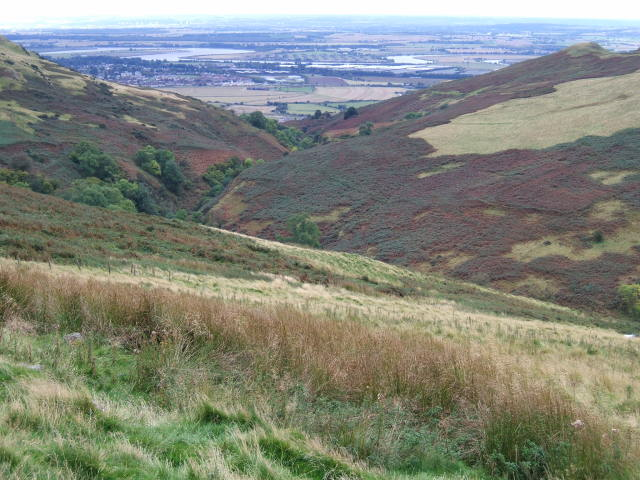
Lower Menstrie Glen from NS842993 looking South

The lower (southern) parts of the glen, reached by footpaths from Menstrie, give access to routes to the summits of Dumyat and Myreton Hill.

A gated farm track leads from Menstrie around the eastern and northern flanks of the glen to the ruin of Red Brae (NS842992), near Jerah.

Another gated farm track goes from the Sherrifmuir Road (at NS819994) past the Lossburn Reservoir, around the southern and western flanks of Menstrie Glen, finally descending past Dumyat Farm (once named Foreside of Lipney) to Cotkerse, a kilometre west of Menstrie at NS834968.

In October 2008, Menstrie Community Council announced a proposal to make access to the glen easier and to install visitor attractions.

In November 2012, UPM Tilhill (a forestry company) announced a plan for commercial forestry on the east and northern flanks of the Menstrie Burn. Communication began between Tillhill and Menstrie Community Council about adjusting the proposed forest layout to retain access for recreational uses.

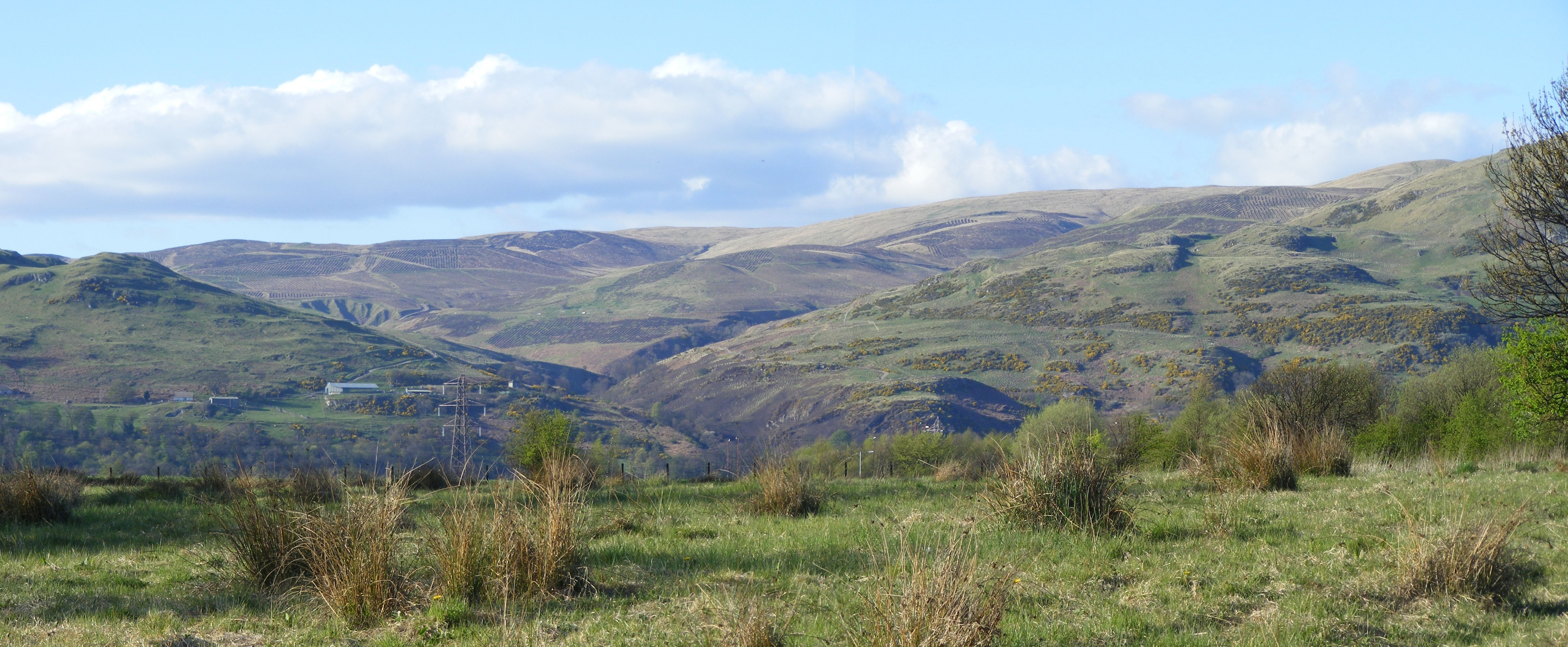
View Northwards to Menstrie Glen from near NS850947 in April 2015

The plan included an area, on Myreton Hill, of broadleaf woodland. This would be the main effect of the plan as seen from Menstrie and nearby Hillfoots villages. The conifer planting would, however, be visible from further afield.

Following consideration of the Environmental Impact Assessment document by The Forestry Commission, planting began in the winter of 2014 - 2015.
