= Menstrie and Glenochil railway station =

Disused railway station in Menstrie, Clackmannanshire

Menstrie and Glenochil

General information
- Location: Menstrie, Clackmannanshire; Scotland
- Coordinates: 56.1502°N 3.8453°W
- Grid reference: NS854968
- Platforms: 1

Other information
- Status: Disused

History
- Original company: Alva Railway
- Pre-grouping: North British Railway
- Post-grouping: London and North Eastern Railway

Key dates
- 3 June 1863: Opened as Menstrie
- April 1954: Name changed to Menstrie and Glenochil
- 1 November 1954: Closed for passengers
- 1965: closed completely
Location

Menstrie and Glenochil railway station served the village of Menstrie, Clackmannanshire, Scotland, from 1863 to 1954 on the Alva Railway.

== History ==
The station was opened on 3 June 1863 by the Alva Railway. On the east side were the station buildings and to the east was the goods yard. Further to the east was Glenochil Distillery, which was served by stabling sidings. It was known as Menstry in the Dunfermline Press when it first opened. It was also known as Menstrie and Glenochil in the 1900 and 1933 revisions of the North British Railway timetable and in the 1904 edition of the handbook of stations. This was changed to Menstrie and Tullibody in the May 1948 edition. Its name was officially changed to Menstrie and Glenochil in April 1954. The station closed for passengers on 1 November 1954. and for goods in 1965.

| Preceding station | Disused railways | Following station |
|---|---|---|
| Terminus | Alva Railway | Alva; Line and station closed |
