= Maeatae =

Confederation of tribes in Roman Britain

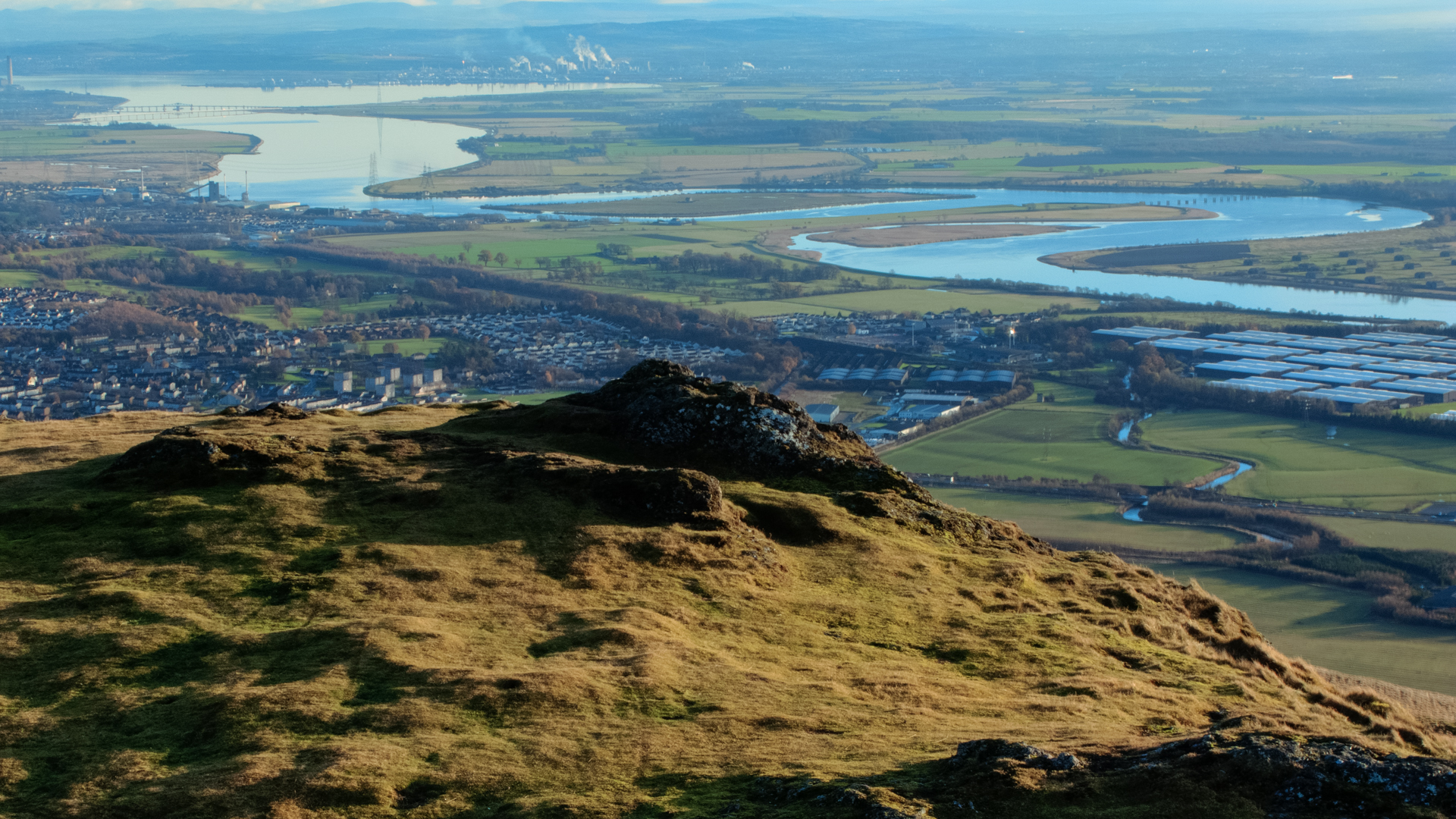
Dumyat summit, with the River Forth in the distance

The Maeatae were a confederation of tribes that probably lived beyond the Antonine Wall in Roman Britain.

The historical sources are vague as to the exact region they inhabited, but an association is thought to be indicated in the names of two hills with fortifications. Near the summit of Dumyat hill in the Ochils, overlooking Stirling, there are remains of a fort and the name of the hill (in Gaelic Dùn Mhèad) is believed to derive from name meaning the hill of the Maeatae. The prominent hill fort may have marked their northern boundary. The first excavations of Dumyat were led by Dr Murray Cook, who recovered a radiocarbon date from a newly discovered external ditch dating to the 5th to 7th centuries AD. Myot Hill, near Fankerton, plausibly marks their southern limits. A discussion of two views of the importance of Dumyat and Myot Hill is given in Wainwright. There are three other potential Maeatae placenames in Scotland, potentially giving them a territory from Balfron to West Lothian and potentially St Andrews: Dunmanyn, Dalmeny, West Lothian, Cremannan, Balfron, Stirlingshire and Rummond (Rodmanand), St Andrews, Fife.

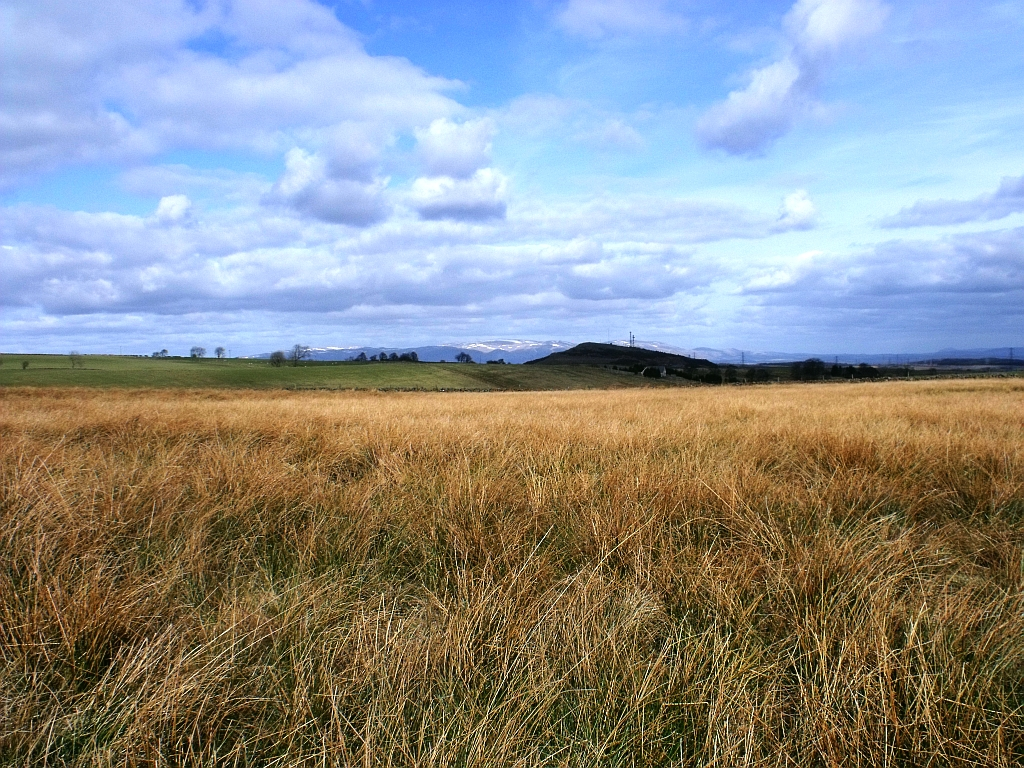
Myot Hill with the Ochils on the horizon

Cassius Dio describes them in detail in his Roman History (Book LXXVII), and is later quoted by Joseph Ritson and others. John Rhys seems convinced that they occupied the land between the Firth of Forth and the Firth of Tay or parts of what is now Clackmannanshire, Fife and Stirlingshire. He also suggests that the Isle of May might derive its name from the tribe. Dio mentions the Maeatae were between the wall and the Caledonians but there is some dispute over whether he is referring to Antonine's Wall or Hadrian's Wall. Alexander del Mar says no-one really knows the identity of the Maeatae but he mentions that some authorities think they may have had a Norse origin.

They appear to have come together as a result of treaties struck between the Roman Empire and the various frontier tribes in the 180s AD under the governorship of Ulpius Marcellus. Virius Lupus is recorded as being obliged to buy peace from the Maeatae at the end of the second century.

In 210 AD, they began a serious revolt against the Roman Empire, which was reportedly a very bloody affair on both sides. Another revolt took place the following year. In 213 AD, Joseph Ritson records them receiving money from the Romans to keep the peace.

The Miathi, mentioned in Adomnán's Life of Columba, probably to be identified with the Southern Picts, have been posited as the same group, their identity seemingly surviving in some form as late as the 6th or 7th centuries AD.
