= Strathdevon =

Valley in Clackmannanshire, Scotland

Coordinates: 56.229°N 3.667°W

Strathdevon is the strath of the River Devon in Clackmannanshire, Scotland. Strathdevon is associated with the parish of Muckhart and was up until 1971 the southernmost tip of Perthshire.

The strath stretches east to west from upper Yetts o' Muckhart and the Glen Devon area westwards along the Ochil Hills. Strathdevon includes the settlements of Muckhart, Dollar, Tillicoultry, Alva and Menstrie on the A91, and Rumbling Bridge. In the upper Yetts o' Muckhart there is a building that was the turnpike for the B934 road that leads to Dunning Glen and the A823, which in turn leads to Glen Devon and Gleneagles.

== Geography ==
The Strathdevon and Crook of Devon areas of Perth and Kinross, in which the River Devon and Black Devon flow, are overlooked by the tops of the Ochil Hills, from where most of the area can be seen. The Black Devon flows past Clackmannan and links with the River Forth south of Alloa. The Ochil Hills supply the water that Highland Spring sells worldwide, and have also been mined for minerals including gold and silver, with cobalt, tin, copper and iron.

Strathdevon is managed by the local authority and land owners, and has various countryside management programs in place. European otter can be seen in early mornings and late evenings in winter time around the Tillicoultry areas of the River Devon. Salmon and sea trout navigate to the Devon and Black Devon a few times per year from Greenland and Arctic areas. Salmon / sea trout steps are located at Cambus and Dollar. The River Devon Angling Association was formed in 1905 and manages over 15 miles (24 km) of this river. Most of Scotland's salmon rivers are managed by the North Atlantic Salmon Conservation Organization (NASCO), and the Rivers and Fisheries Trusts of Scotland (RAFTS).

== See also ==
- List of rivers of Scotland
