= Menstrie =

Coordinates: 56.15085°N 3.85438°W

Menstrie: Scottish Gaelic: Meanstraidh
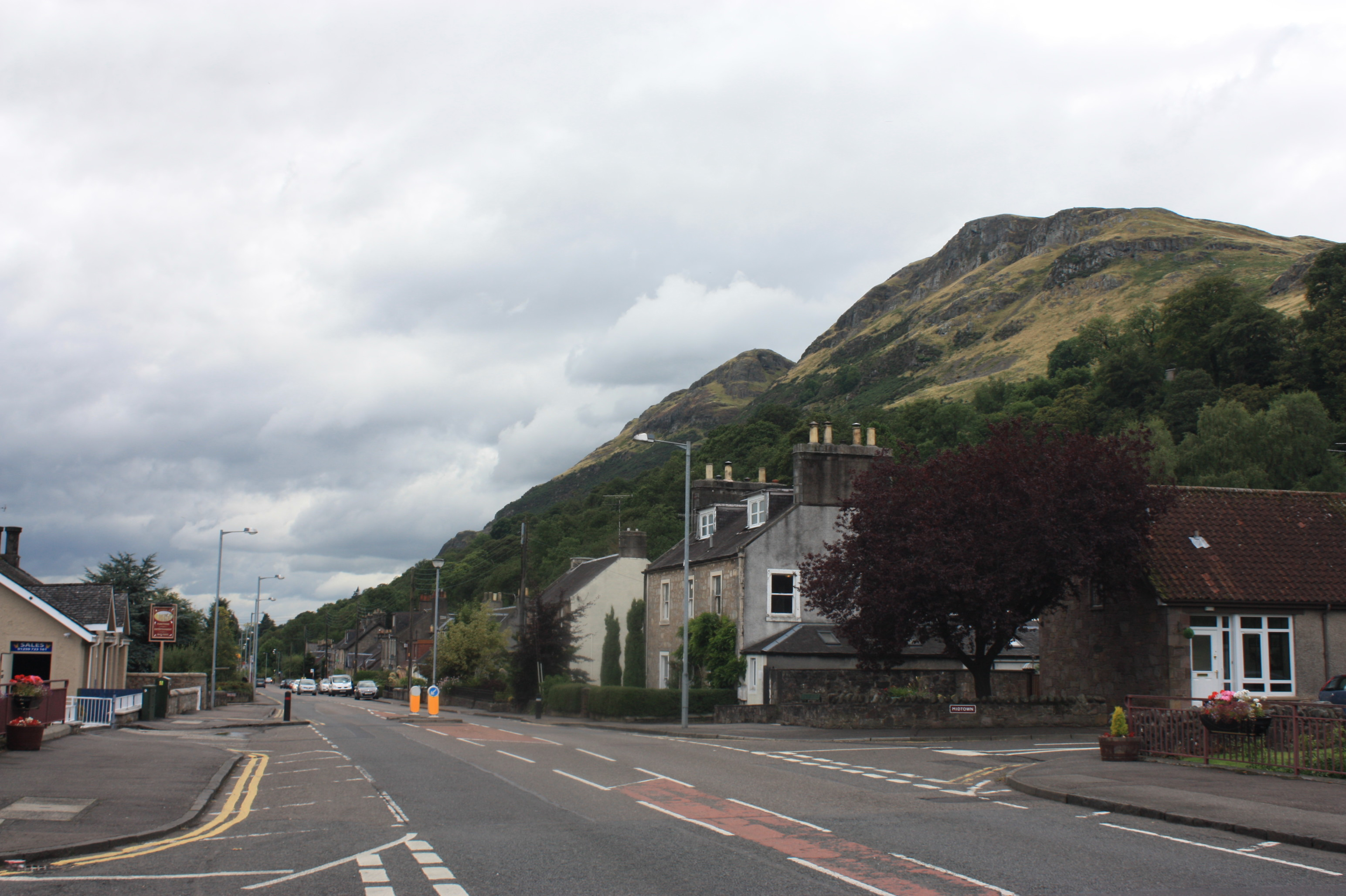
- The main road through Menstrie, under the Ochil Hills

- Location within Clackmannanshire
- Population: 2,870 (2020)
- OS grid reference: NS852969
- Council area: Clackmannanshire
- Lieutenancy area: Clackmannanshire
- Country: Scotland
- Sovereign state: United Kingdom
- Post town: Menstrie
- Postcode district: FK11
- Dialling code: 01259
- Police: Scotland
- Fire: Scottish
- Ambulance: Scottish
- UK Parliament: Alloa and Grangemouth
- Scottish Parliament: Clackmannanshire and Dunblane

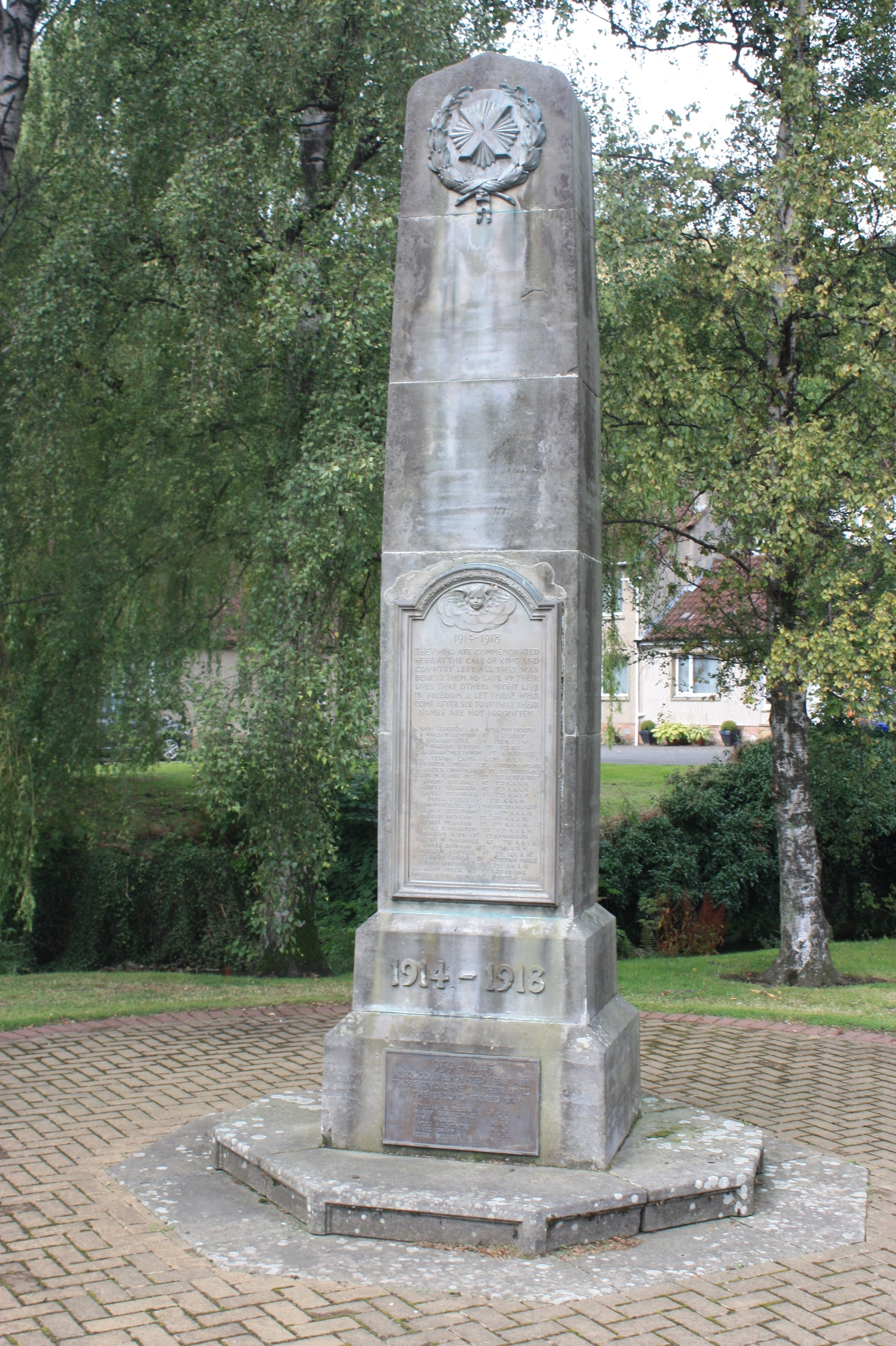
Menstrie War Memorial

Menstrie (Scottish Gaelic: Meanstraidh) is a village in the county of Clackmannanshire in Scotland. It is about five miles (eight kilometres) east-northeast of Stirling and is one of a string of towns that, because of their location at the foothill base of the Ochil Hills, are collectively referred to as the Hillfoots Villages or simply The Hillfoots.

== Etymology ==
The name Menstrie, recorded as Mestreth and Mestryn in the 1260s, is of Pictish origin. The name is composed of elements cognate to Welsh maes, meaning 'field, plain', and tref, 'town, village, farm'.

== Physical geography ==
Menstrie stands on the carse or flood plain of the River Devon, between 10 and 20 metres altitude above sea level. It is roughly astride the Ochil Fault whose movement gave rise to the dramatic southern scarp of the Ochils but which is now almost quiescent.

Two of the most westerly summits of the Ochil Hills, Dumyat and Myreton Hill, rise steeply to the north of the village to reach about 400m altitude. These two hills are divided by Menstrie Glen, from which the small watercourse of Menstrie Burn emerges and runs through the village. About a kilometre to the south of Menstrie, the burn joins the River Devon which in turn meets the River Forth at Cambus.

The Menstrie Burn, though generally tranquil, drains a catchment area (Menstrie Glen) of about 14 km^{2} in the Ochil Hills and occasionally experiences flash floods. On 29 August 2012, the burn overflowed its banks and 38 elderly residents of Menstrie House had to be evacuated to other care homes within the region. No-one was hurt. The Community Centre and some nearby roads and houses were also flooded though no residents needed evacuation. The A91 road was closed for some hours while structural engineers checked the integrity of the bridges over the burn. Clackmannanshire Council commissioned a consultants' report on the flood event and has made the summary available to the public in PDF format.

Menstrie Glen had been used for sheep farming. However, a large part of it is now given over to commercial forestry, with a strip of new mixed woodland planted closest to Menstrie Burn.

== Facilities ==
The village has one general store (containing the post office), a pharmacy, a pub (The Holly Tree), café (Minnie's Cafe), beauty clinic (the Doll House), two take aways (Flames and Sammy's Indian Grill) and a petrol station. A large community centre, the Dumyat Centre is located at the centre of the village opposite the pub and includes a library, sports hall, sports changing rooms, meeting rooms, kitchen and public toilets. The Dumyat Centre services a public park with sports fields, children's play area, green gym, and off street parking. The village has an active Bowling club, and Scout, Cub, Beavers and Guide, Brownies and Rainbows groups with the Scouts based at the Menstrie Scout Hall next to Menstrie Burn. It also has a primary school, a community garden on Castle Terrace, a residential establishment for older people, Menstrie House and two churches; one being Menstrie Parish Church (Church of Scotland) and the other being of the United Free Church of Scotland. In 2018 Clackmannanshire Council, as part of council wide cuts, announced plans to close the Dumyat Centre. A local residents group, Menstrie Community Action Group, is now (Nov 2019) running Menstrie's Dumyat Centre on behalf of the local community.

== Transport links ==
Menstrie is on the A91 road from Stirling to St Andrews. It used to be served by Menstrie and Glenochil railway station on the Alva Line until that closed. Bus services run to Stirling via Stirling University, to Alloa via Alva and Tillicoultry or via Tullibody, and less frequently to St Andrews. Beginning in late 2010, bus services also run to Clackmannan and to Forth Valley Royal Hospital near Falkirk via Alloa.

== Industry and population ==
A conspicuous zig-zag roadway up the scarp face of Myreton Hill, nowadays used by the local sheep farmer for access to his livestock, was originally built during the Napoleonic Wars for access to some mine workings, which produced calcite. However, the volume of material mined was rather small in proportion to the effort needed to build the road, so the venture is unlikely to have been economic. There seems to be no record of why calcite was considered to be sufficiently valuable to have justified the considerable effort.

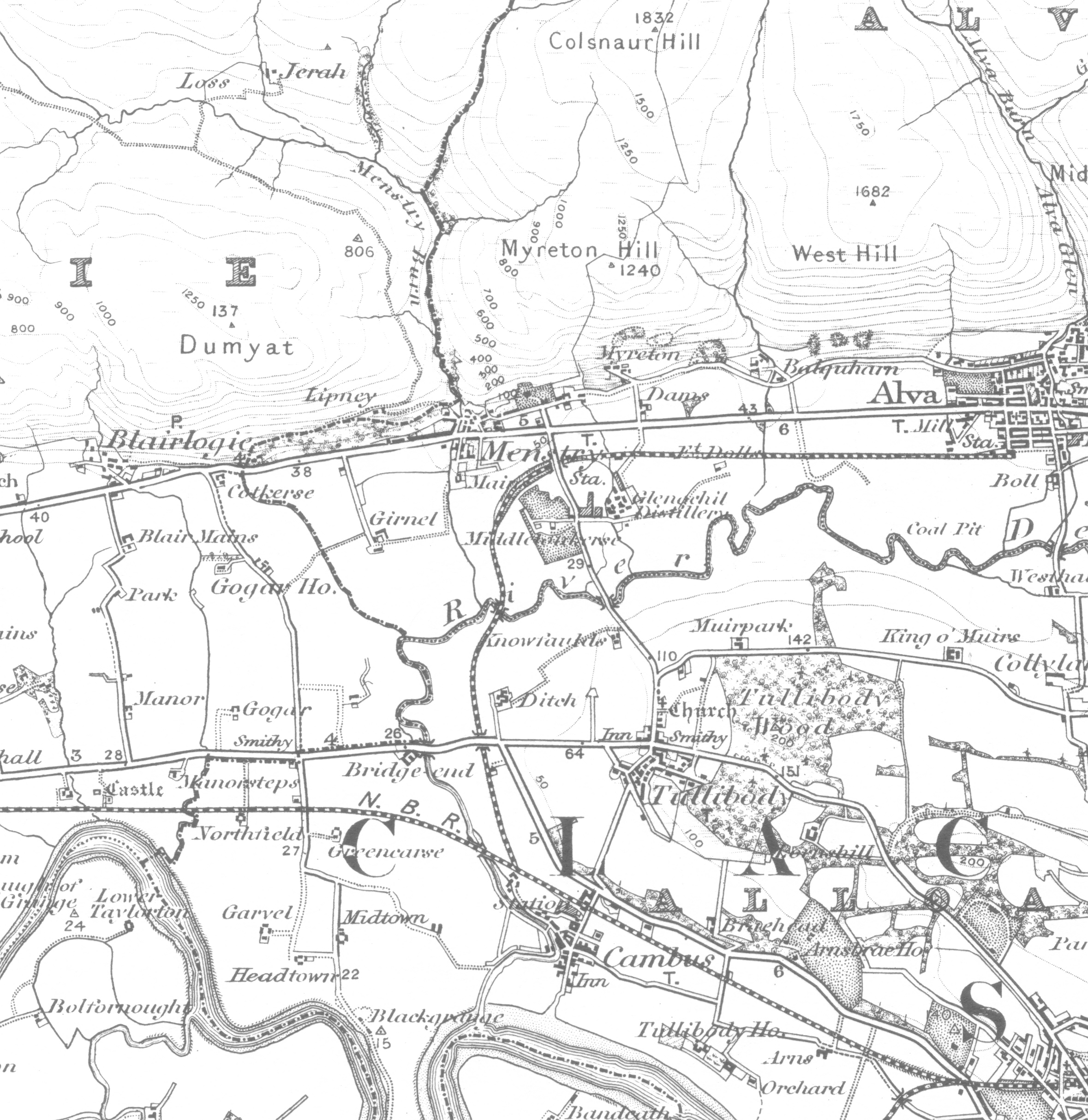
Menstrie and surrounding area in 1895

The occupants of Menstrie once processed wool from sheep farmed on the Ochils. In 1800, businessmen from Tullibody set up a carding and spinning mill on the east side of the Menstrie Burn to exploit its soft water and power, absent from their own village.

In the early 19th century a straight road was built on the flat ground of the carse or floodplain to by-pass the old Hillfoots Road and improve the transport of goods to and from the Hillfoots villages. Menstrie's Long Row and Ochil Road lie on the old route along the foot of the hills. The new road, now the A91, became a focus for construction of churches, houses, mills and shops.

By the mid-19th century, the Elmbank and Forthvale mills were in business on either side of the Menstrie Burn.

In 1841, Menstrie's population was about 500 but had increased to more than 900 by 1881.

In the 1860s a company, which included the owners of local mills and a distillery, financed a branch railway line through Menstrie to a terminus in Alva. This joined the old North British Railway (N.B.R.) line between Alloa and Stirling at Cambus.A goods train delivered Molasses to docks at Greenock. Menstrie had its own passenger station at the North end of Tullibody Road. Practically nothing of the station remains and the railway branch line, which continued to carry freight after the Beeching Axe, fell into disuse during the mid-1980s in favour of road transport.

The Glenochil Distillery had opened in the middle 18th century on the site of the Doll Farm to the east of the village, beside the Dams Burn. At its peak, around one million bottles of grain whisky were made. Manufacturing has continued on this site for more than 250 years though production of whisky stopped around 1930. Yeast, initially a by-product of whisky fermentation, had gradually become the main product and went for manufacture of whisky and bread. Soft water, locally available, is still useful. An extensive bonded warehouse area remains for storage of whisky as it matures in barrels before bottling, while bakers' yeast has given way to fermentation products derived from yeast.

The whisky and yeast businesses are now operated by separate companies, namely Diageo, (successors to Distillers Company) and Kerry Group. The latter conducts product development as well as manufacturing at the Menstrie site.

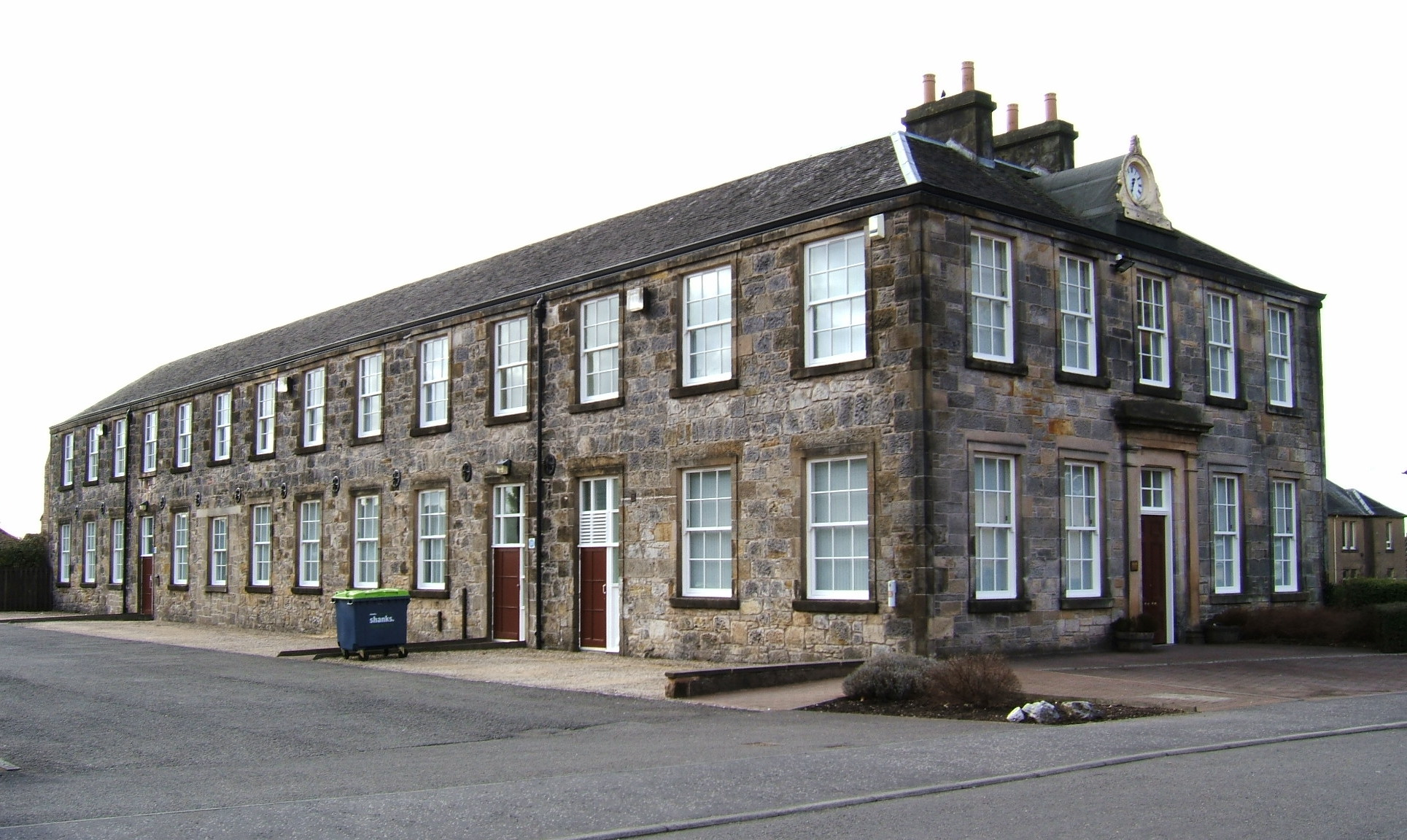
Elmbank Mill, Menstrie in March 2010

The Forthvale Mill no longer stands but the Elmbank Mill, having been used for some years as offices by the Water Board, now houses small businesses.

A furniture factory, The Charrier, stood near the Menstrie Burn but was destroyed by fire in about 1968. A street nearby now bears its name.

In the mid-20th Century, Menstrie (pop. 1200 – 1300) was home to families whose menfolk worked the Clackmannanshire Coalfield and other mines in Central Scotland.

As the mining and textile industries have declined, Menstrie has become a commuter village, spreading over the adjacent farmland. At the Censuses in 1991, 2001 and 2011, Menstrie's population was 2274, 2083 and 2804 respectively. For 2016, the population was estimated as 2872. ('Data' tab)

In 2014, Menstrie was rated the fourth most attractive postcode area to live in Scotland.

== Commercial forestry ==
A forestry company, UPM Tilhill, has published plans to plant commercial woodland in the Ochil Hills above Menstrie on the eastern and northern flanks of Menstrie Glen. This would affect recreational use and customary access routes, though UPM have made alterations to accommodate some concerns.

Forestry operations, including movement of heavy machinery and extraction of harvested timber would take place via widened roads and strengthened bridges on Sheriffmuir rather than through Menstrie, according to the plan.

The plan includes an area, on Myreton Hill, of broadleaf woodland. This would be the main effect seen from Menstrie and nearby Hillfoots villages. The conifer planting would, however, be visible from further afield; for instance Stirling Castle, National Wallace Monument and Tullibody.

Planting had begun by early 2015.

== Recreation ==
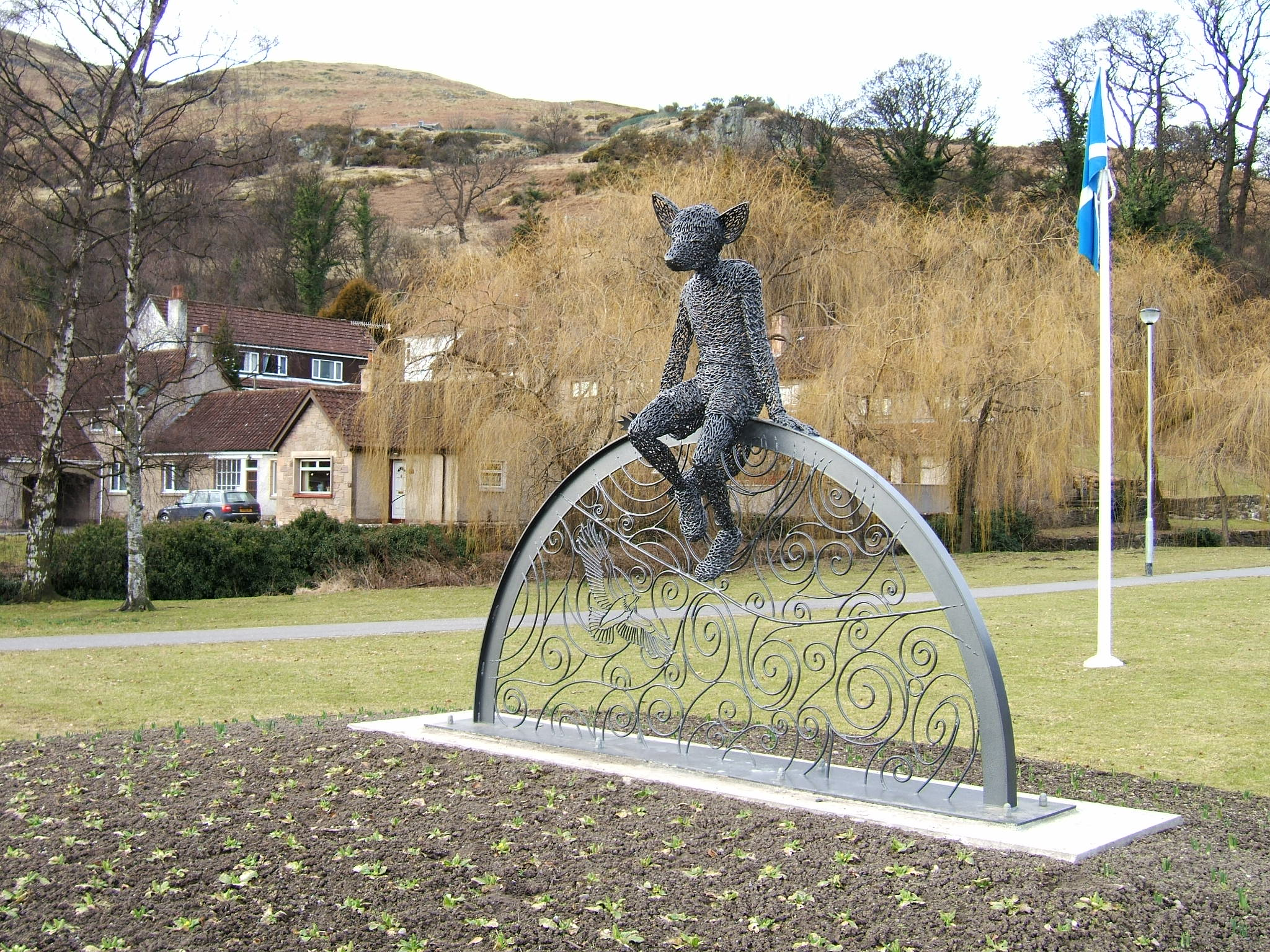
"Fox Boy" sculpture by Andy Scott

Menstrie stands on The Hillfoots Way, a walking route that follows much of the old King's Highway. The Hillfoots Way goes from Logie Old Kirk in the west to Muckhart in the east, along the foot of the Ochils. The King's Highway (via regia in Latin) is mentioned in charters for Cambuskenneth Abbey that date to the 1300s and may have been used for royal progresses between Stirling Castle and Falkland Palace in the 16th century.

The back road between the entrance to Broomhall Castle and Alva is a quiet cycle and pedestrian friendly road whilst a pedestrian and cycle path runs from east of the Old Menstrie Burn bridge to Blairlogie House through the Menstrie Community woodland on the North side of the A91 road.

The disused railway line served as an unofficial walking route to Tullibody over the bridge across the River Devon. In October 2007 Clackmannanshire Council published a map which designated part of the railway line, by then heavily overgrown, as an Aspirational Core Path linking Menstrie and Cambus. By February 2010 the branch line had been sold by BRB (Residuary) Limited and by March 2011 the rails and sleepers had all been removed. Work on the path was completed by April 2012, as scheduled. The path now forms part of National Cycle Network Route 768.

Menstrie has a Scout Group, established in 1908, and a bowling club established in 1925.

Menstrie and the nearby Blairlogie are popular access points for hillwalkers to Dumyat, a peak in the Ochil Hills and from Menstrie to Myreton Hill, the zig zag hillside path from Ochil Road is used by mountain bikers and hillwalkers.

Fox Boy, a work by the sculptor Andy Scott, stands in the centre of Menstrie in Midtown Gardens (now named the "Nova Scotia Gardens" to commemorate the village's historical connection). The sculpture combines references to the water wheels that once powered industry in Menstrie, a pet fox kept by a Menstrie child years ago, and the buzzards that frequent the skies over the village. Midtown Gardens flies the flag of Nova Scotia highlighting its role with the settlement and development of Nova Scotia.

A popular and well attended village gala week is held in early June with a gala itself held on the main park next to the Dumyat Centre on the Saturday.

There is an active Community Council and a village newsletter, Menstrie Matters, published quarterly and distributed to every household.

== Architecture and housing ==
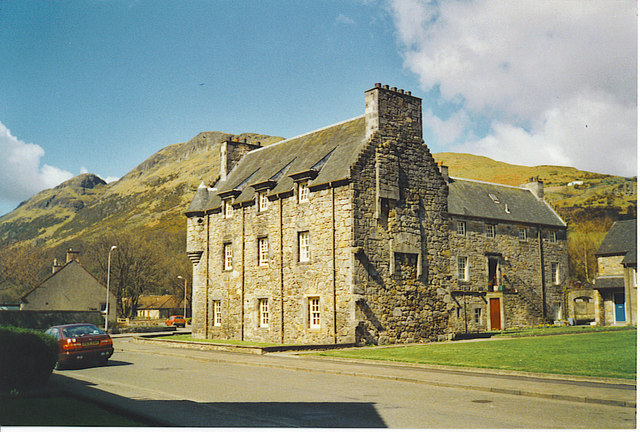
Menstrie Castle

Menstrie Castle was the birthplace of Sir William Alexander, James VI's Chartered Lieutenant for the Plantation of Nova Scotia 2021 sees the 400th anniversary of this event. Despite its name, it is described as a "three-storey castellated house", and lacks many fortified features, standing as it does on low ground and constructed at a time of relative national calm. The building is now residential and has won a Civic Trust award. The National Trust for Scotland operate a small museum exhibition commemorating the link between Menstrie, William Alexander, and Nova Scotia and is open to the public (on a restricted basis, two days per week)

The old village was centred on the Hillfoots road either side of the Menstrie Burn, crossed by the still-surviving Auld Brig, thought to date to 1656 or 1665. It is listed category B and described in The Royal Commission on the Ancient and Historical Monuments of Scotland under number 219364.

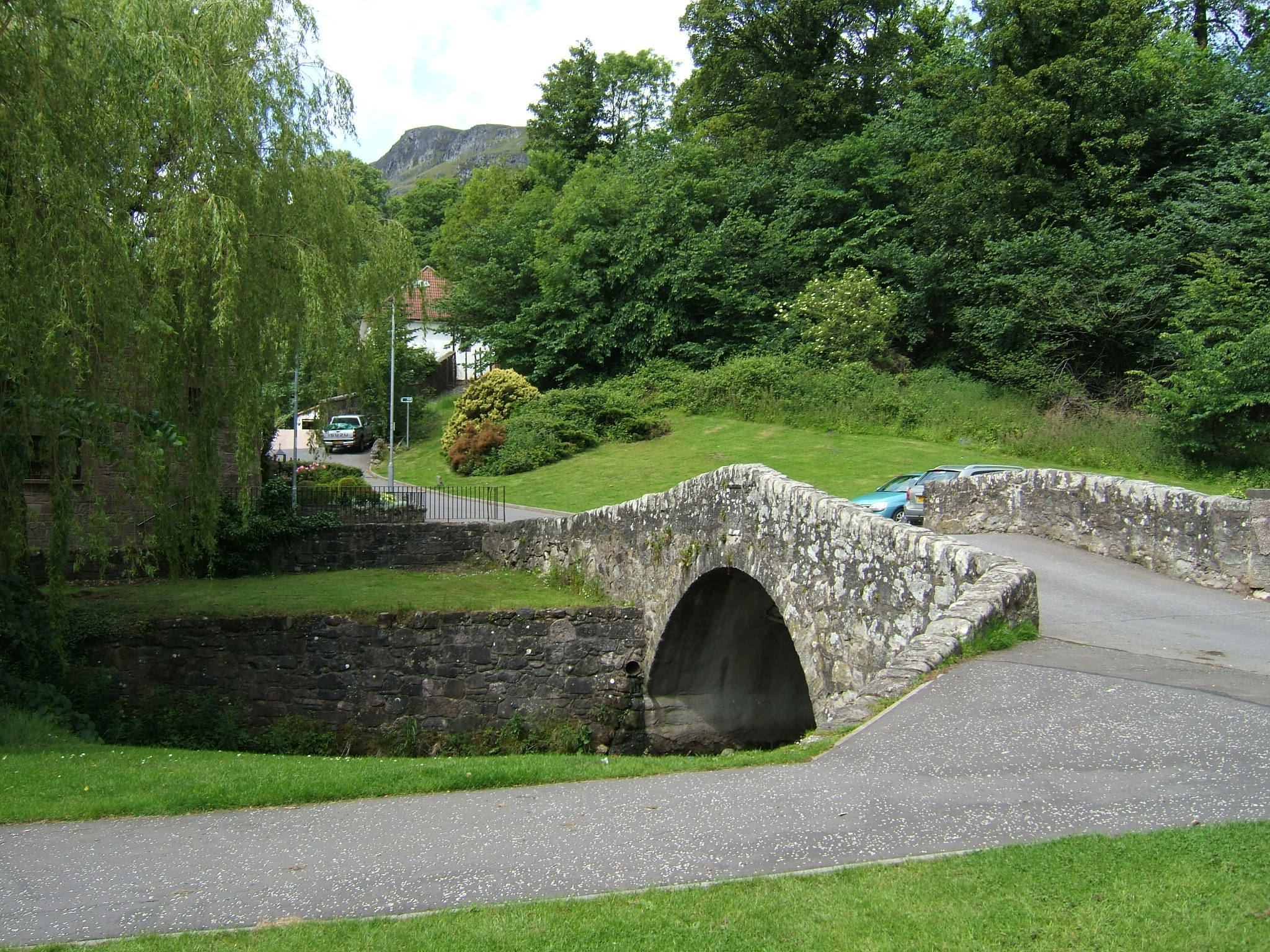
The Old Bridge, Menstrie

The remainder of the old village, containing a number of interesting early eighteenth century cottages, and a larger house known locally as Windsor Castle, were demolished in the mid-twentieth century under slum clearance legislation. The fragmentary ruins of the old mill, dating to 1642, can be seen by the burn behind the Scout Hall.

In 1874, James Johnstone, one of the partners in the Elmbank Mill, had built for himself the Scottish baronial-style Broom Hall on the lower slope of Myreton Hill. It operated for a time as a private Boys School called Clifford Park. It was burned out in the 1940s and stood as an abandoned shell until 1985 when it was converted into a nursing home. It has since been refurbished and operates a restaurant and bar and is a popular wedding and event location.

The war memorial was erected in 1922 and lists those killed in the World Wars. The bulk of those killed in the First World War were in the 7th Battalion Argyll and Sutherland Highlanders. In June 2016 a plaque was unveiled at the war memorial remembering the Polish soldiers who were stationed in the village.

As a commuter village Menstrie has undergone a period of expansion since 2000, with new housing built to the west and south of the village. The firm responsible for maintenance of common areas around the new housing is currently (spring 2012) in dispute with an association of residents. The residents complain that: the maintenance work fails to meet standards stated in the deeds; that the charges are excessive; and that the company has resorted to excessively heavy-handed methods to extract payment, accusations the company rejects. There are eight roads/ streets in Menstrie named after hills on the Ochils, Dumyat Road, Craighorn, Craigomus, Colsnaur, Lipney, Losshill, Myreton and Castle Road.There are six roads / streets in Menstrie named after families. Abercrombie, Cairns, Windsor, Johnstone, Holbourne, and Victoria

In December 2009, Clackmannanshire Council announced an alteration to the local development plan for housing land. This allowed for construction of 175 new housing units, including 36 termed 'affordable', to the south-east of the village. The Council subsequently modified the plan as recommended by a Reporter appointed by Scottish Ministers. In the absence of further directions from the ministers, the council formally adopted the modified plan in the autumn of 2011. Among other stipulations and guidelines the modified plan as adopted allowed for 175 housing units, 43 affordable; and required a detailed Flood Risk Assessment to determine ground conditions and water management needs on and for the site.

An application for construction of 84 houses on the site was made on 8 April 2013. Among the documents relating to the application, one from SEPA on 30 October 2013 stated "... we would not support the proposal to include additional properties behind the embankment as we would not consider this area to be outwith the 1:200 year flood extent." The application was subsequently removed from the planning register.
