= Myreton Hill =

High point in the Ochil Hills, Scotland

Coordinates: 56.16184°N 3.84042°W

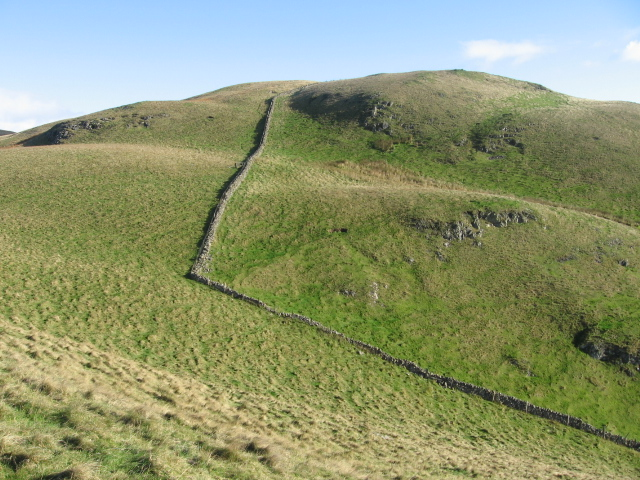

Highest point
- Elevation: 388.1 m (1,273 ft)
- Prominence: 54 m (177 ft)

Geography
- Location within Scotland
- Location: Clackmannanshire, Scotland
- Parent range: Ochil Hills
- OS grid: NS858981
- Topo map: OS Landranger 57

Myreton Hill is a peak near the village of Menstrie in the Ochil Hills of Scotland.

== Location ==
The hill is located immediately to the north-east of the village of Menstrie in the Ochil Hills, in Clackmannanshire in the Central Lowlands of Scotland. It is northwest of Alloa and northeast of Stirling.

== Topography and walking routes ==
The hill is an outlier in the southern part of the Ochil Hills. The Menstrie Burn runs in a deep valley, the Menstrie Glen, north to south along its western face, joined by the First Incha Burn from two branches on its northern slopes, while the Balquharn Burn runs north-south on its eastern slopes. At 387 or 388.1 metres, the hill is the 9013th highest point in the British Isles. Myreton Hill is not quite as tall as its neighbour Dumyat, from which it is separated by the deep Menstrie Glen. Dumyat is also a more popular walking destination.

There is road access to the base of the hill, and a bus service to Menstrie from both Alloa and Stirling.

The track up the scarp face of Myreton Hill leads to some calcite workings. It was used by a farmer, the owner of the Jerah holding, to access his sheep. This track also forms the beginning of a walking route to deeper parts of the Ochil Hills.

There are remains of a dun, a possible Iron Age fortification, on the slopes of the hill. Part of the hill is also within a designated Site of Special Scientific Interest.

== Other activities ==
Myreton Hill is useful to, and popular with, the paragliding community, as it is easily ascended to a suitable point while carrying equipment. Dozens of paragliding enthusiasts have used this place for their hobby.

== Commercial forestry ==
A forestry company, UPM Tilhill, published plans to plant commercial woodland in the Ochil Hills above Menstrie, on behalf of the farmer owner, including on the eastern and northern flanks of Menstrie Glen. The plan includes an area, on Myreton Hill, of broadleaf woodland and would affect recreational use and customary access routes. UPM made alterations to accommodate some concerns and their plans were approved by the Scottish Forestry Commission in October 2014.
