= Ochil Fault =

Scottish geological feature

Coordinates: 56.160°N 3.746°W

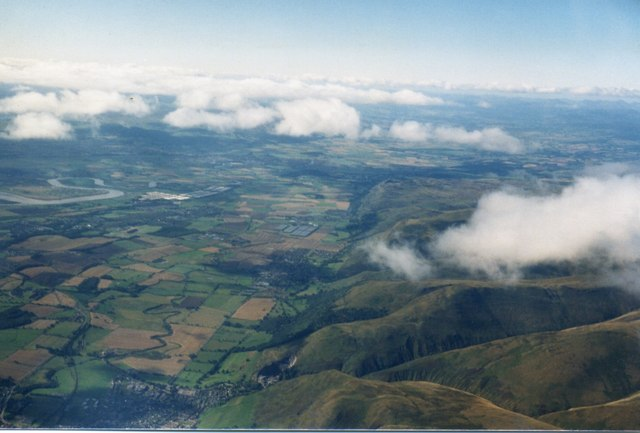
An aerial view of the Ochil Fault

The Ochil Fault is the geological feature which defines the southern edge of the Ochil Hills escarpment in Scotland.

North of the fault, Devonian lava flows and pyroclastic deposits slope gently down, thinning towards the north. These are in part overlain by Old Red Sandstone rocks formed later in the Devonian period. Because the deposits thin towards the north, and there are few signs of volcanic necks within the Ochil Hills themselves, it is thought that the eruptive centres were south of the fault, however these are buried deep beneath the Carboniferous rocks including coal measures which are found beneath the low-lying carse lands to the south.

To put this in perspective, the prominent hill Dumyat which defines the western extremity of the Ochil Hills has a height of 418 metres (1,371 ft). The nearest colliery, Manor Powis, approximately 2 kilometres (1.2 mi) south of the fault, was approximately the same depth, in carse land that is scarcely above sea level, and was mining coal from Carboniferous strata at least many hundreds of metres above the top of the Devonian deposits. The Ochil Fault was active from the earliest part of the Carboniferous period, allowing the marine swamps in which the coal-producing vegetation flourished to be periodically overlain by layers of sand, forming sandstone, or silt, forming shale, in a number of cyclic subsidences. These occurred in the form of basins, and the pattern of movements was complex, however it is known that the greatest vertical movement was centred about 1 kilometre (0.62 mi) east of the town of Alva, and almost certainly exceeded 5 kilometres (3.1 mi) vertically. The deepest deposits of coal measures are obviously found in this region, but this has not been mined to its full extent, probably due to the great depth involved.

The point of maximum downwards movement south of the fault lies just south of the Silver Glen, which happens to be the part of the Ochil Hills where the greatest extent of mineralisation has been discovered. The minerals, including ores of silver and cobalt, were probably emplaced by hydrothermal solutions percolating upwards through various minor faults and fractures, in the Tertiary period.

The Ochil Fault remained active throughout geological time, and some later movements allowed intrusive eruptions of diorite or quartz-dolerite to rise at various places along its length.

Modern movements of the fault are very minor but occasionally give rise to discernible earthquakes, particularly in the village of Menstrie, and the town of Tillicoultry. However the latter may be easily confused with the collapse of old room and pillar coal mine workings which undoubtedly underlie the southern part of the town.

The Ochil Fault is one of Britain's finest examples of a fault line scarp, and can be best appreciated from vantage points such as the Wallace Monument near Stirling.
