= Dumyat =

Mountain in the United Kingdom

Coordinates: 56.15769°N 3.87725°W

- Dùn Mhèad
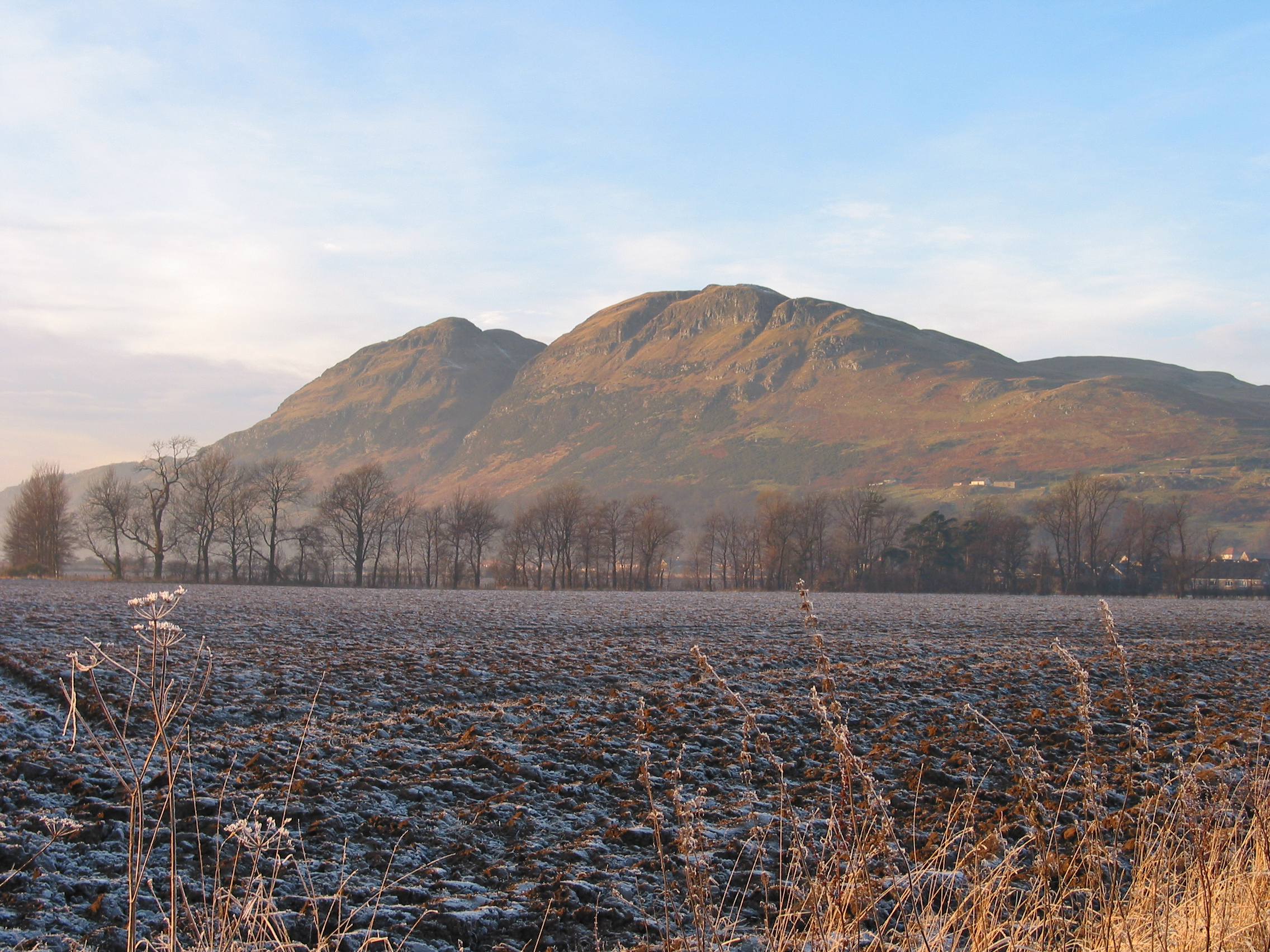
- view of the south elevation of the Dumyat.

Highest point
- Elevation: 418 m (1,371 ft)
- Prominence: 190 m (620 ft)
- Parent peak: West Lomond
- Isolation: 2.49 km (1.55 mi)
- Listing: Marilyn

Naming
- English translation: Hill fort of the Maeatae
- Language of name: Brythonic
- Pronunciation: /dəˈmaɪ.ɪt/

Geography
- Location within Scotland
- Location: Clackmannanshire, Scotland
- Parent range: Ochil Hills
- OS grid: NS835977
- Topo map: OS Landranger 57

Dumyat or Dunmyat /dəˈmaɪ.ɪt/ (Scottish Gaelic: Dùn Mhèad) is a hill at the western extremity of the Ochil Hills in central Scotland. The name is thought to originate from Dun (hill fort) of the Maeatae.

Although relatively small (its height is 418 metres), the characteristic shape of the hill forms an important part of the distinctive scenery of the Stirling area, and it is often depicted (particularly in postcards and calendars) in combination with the nearby Abbey Craig. The hill is a popular climb with tourists and visitors to the Stirling and Trossachs area, due to the historical nature of Stirling and the proximity of the Wallace Monument.

Dumyat has two principal summits: Castle Law on the west, and Dumyat proper on the east. On the summit of Castle Law the remains of an ancient hill fort, originally occupied by the Maeatae, are still clearly discernible. The fort is a scheduled monument. The fort has been subject to excavation by Dr Murray Cook and Professor Gordon Noble of Aberdeen University. Radiocarbon dates from the site indicate at least two periods of use: c. 500 BC and 5th to 5th to 7th century AD.

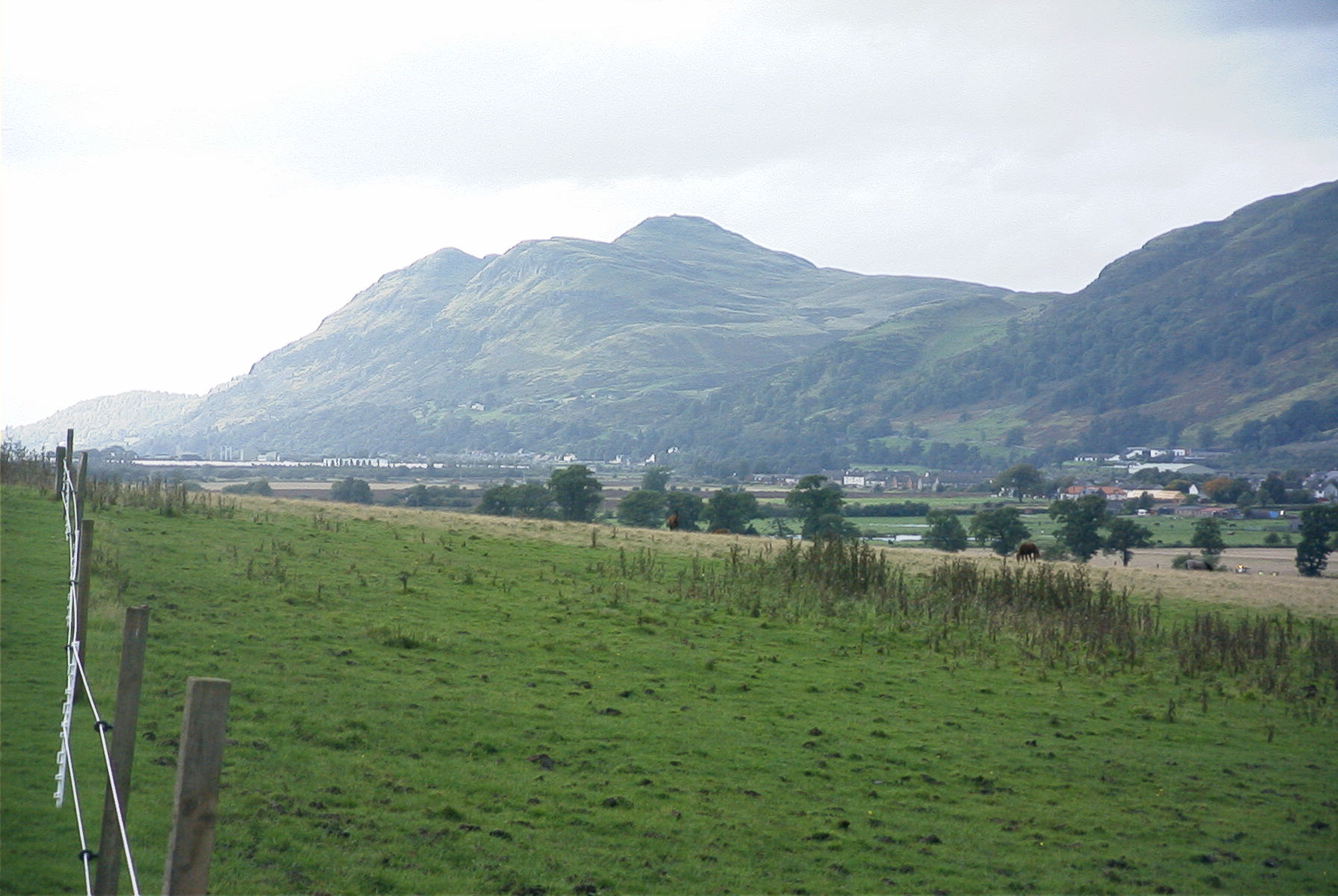
A view of Dumyat from the site of the old Devon Colliery. Menstrie is visible at the base of the hill, with Menstrie Glen to the right.

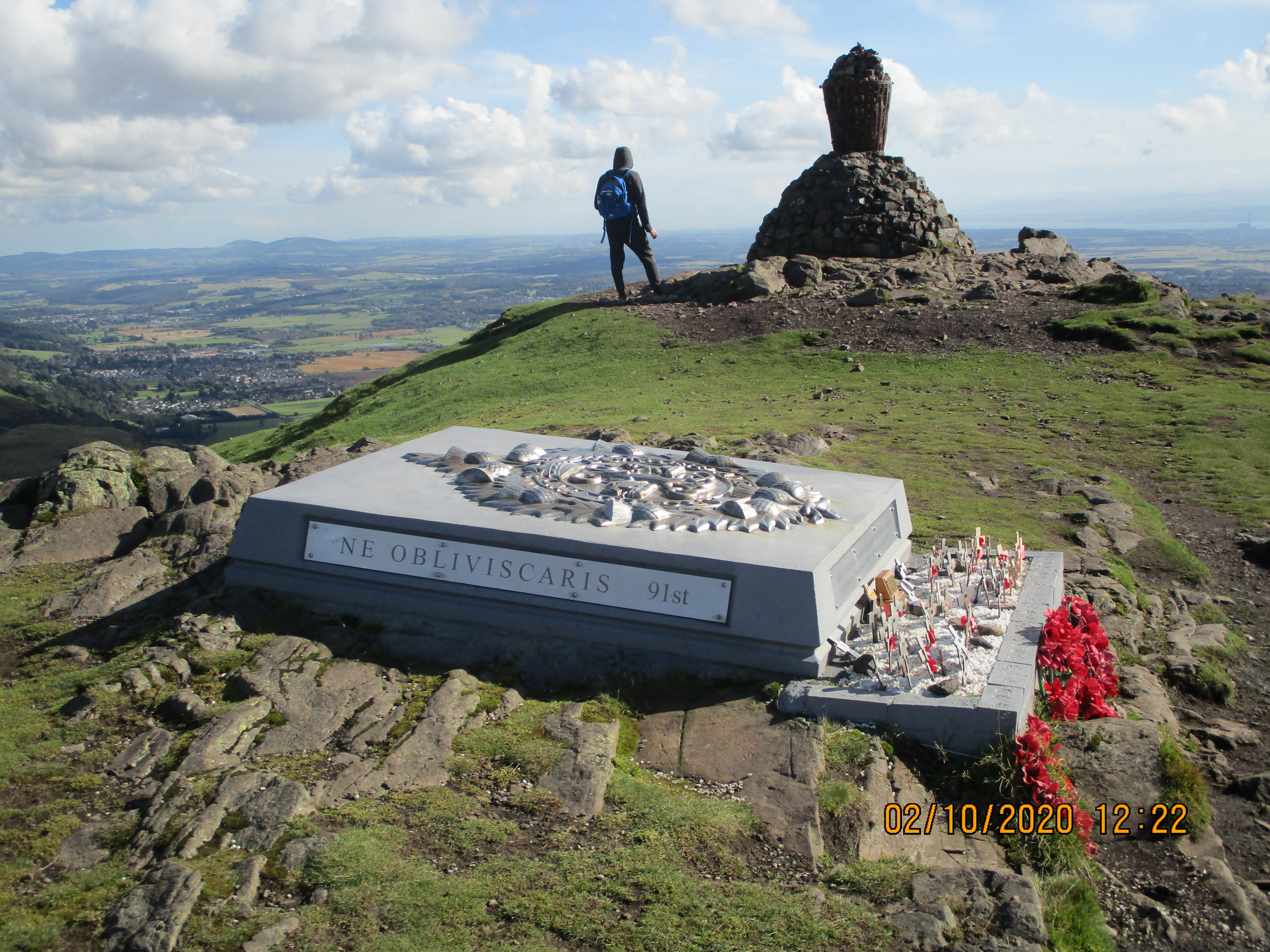
This photo shows the memorial to the regiment of Argyll and Sutherland Highlanders and also the beacon brazier now filled with stones

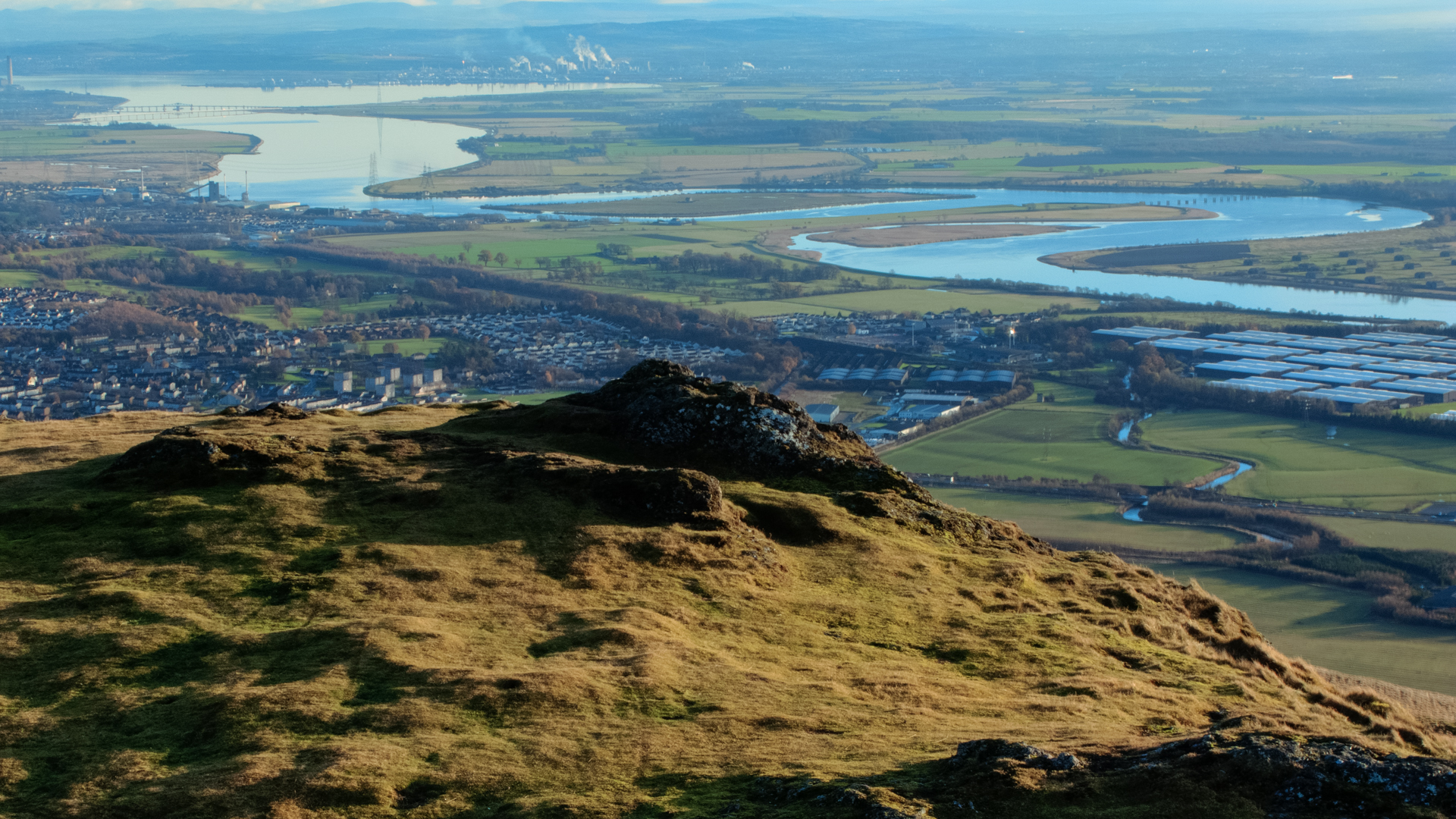
View from Dumyat looking south-east towards Grangemouth Refinery's cooling towers and the River Forth, December 2013

At one time the favourite route to the summit of either Dumyat or Castle Law was via the prominent gulley which runs almost straight up the southern scarp face, and continues down the gently sloping north face. This gulley was formed by the erosion of a fault, resulting from the juxtaposition of soft pyroclastic rocks on one side against harder andesite and basalt on the other. This has resulted in an area where hard andesite slightly overhangs, and is the darkest and least exposed part of the climb, which is not particularly difficult. Further gullies, formed by secondary tearing around the main fault (itself a product of the major disturbance which resulted from the Ochil Fault) extend to the right into Dumyat, and form potential shortcuts to the summit. The first of these, Raeburn's Gulley, is particularly dangerous and should only be attempted by experienced and properly equipped rock climbers, however the second, Siart Gulley, is climbable by anyone of average ability, if care is taken in scrambling up the steep step at the end. The third, fourth and fifth gullies are not named, and become progressively easier.

Nowadays many people park their cars on Sheriffmuir and take a longer but more gently sloping path to the summit, passing behind, i.e. slightly to the north of, the summit of Castle Law. The third route is via Menstrie Glen from the east, and is a somewhat gentle ascent in the beginning, which steepens satisfactorily for those who like a decent climb, as the summit is approached.

The exposed terrain of Dumyat and the surrounding muir are suitable only for sheep farming, with several sheep folds dotting the hill's sides, along with the ruins of a shepherd's stone house. Dumyat was formerly the site of small-scale mining for copper and barytes, although these workings are now abandoned.

The scree on the scarp face of Castle Law is a source of agates, not necessarily of the finest quality, but occasionally other specimens such as smoky quartz and citrine can be found, along with the inevitable quartz, calcite, barytes, and two ores of copper, malachite, and less commonly, azurite.

At the top is a memorial to the Argyll and Sutherland Highlanders, a memorial bench to Mr Michael Simpson (a long serving and much loved member of the Open University) a trig point, and a characteristic cairn with a beacon on top that is currently filled with stones. The stones which are placed in the beacon are all wishes that have been made by others. The beacon on the top of Dumyat was commissioned for the Queen's Silver Jubilee in 1977. It was carried up and erected by the Menstrie Scout Group and was part of the UK chain of beacons lit as part of the Jubilee celebrations.
