= Broomhall Castle =

Coordinates: 56°09′13″N 3°50′52″W

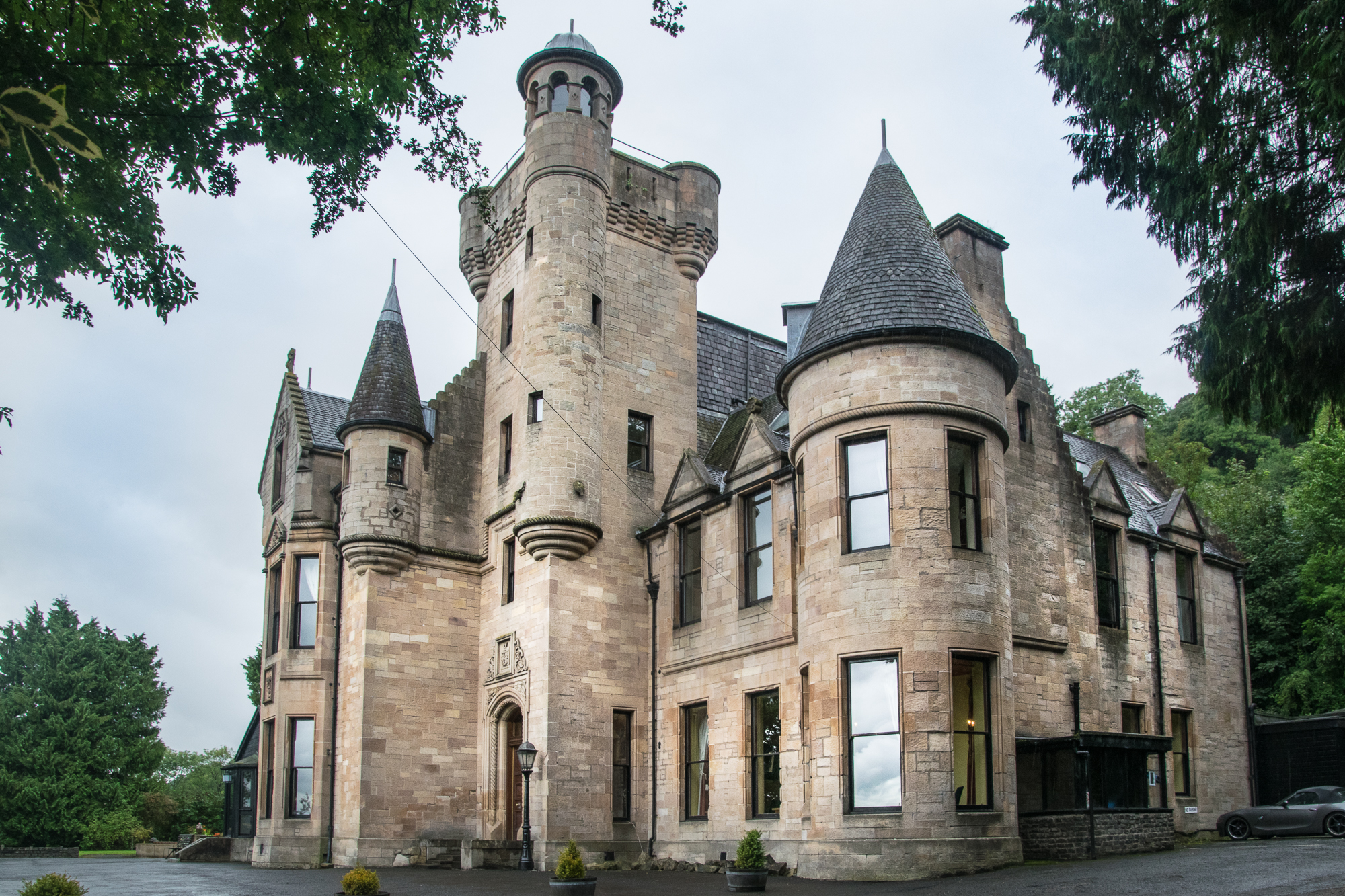
- The castle in 2017
- Interactive map of the Broomhall Castle area

General information
- Location: Scotland

Broomhall Castle is a mansion house originally called Broom Hall and was built in 1874 by John Foukes and Frances Mackison for James Johnstone. It is situated in Menstrie, Clackmannanshire, Scotland on the Ochil Hills and comprises three storeys and a tower.

== History ==
In 1906, the wealth of the builder declined, and the castle was sold to an Italian Riding School. By 1910, it became the Clifford Park Boys Prep School.

On Friday 28 June 1940, the building caught fire whilst the boarders were camping in the grounds. Despite the efforts of the Alloa Fire Brigade, the building was gutted. It was left in ruins until 1985, when it was rebuilt and turned into a nursing home.

In 2003, it was purchased, and the owners then turned it into a small hotel, and was run as a 16 bedroom hotel, with a restaurant and a lounge.

In the summer of 2022, Broomhall Castle went into liquidation. In 2023, Broomhall Castle changed ownership. The new owner is currently reopening the hotel.
