= Alva railway station =

Disused railway station in Alva, Clackmannanshire

Coordinates: 56.15050°N 3.80291°W

Alva Allamhagh
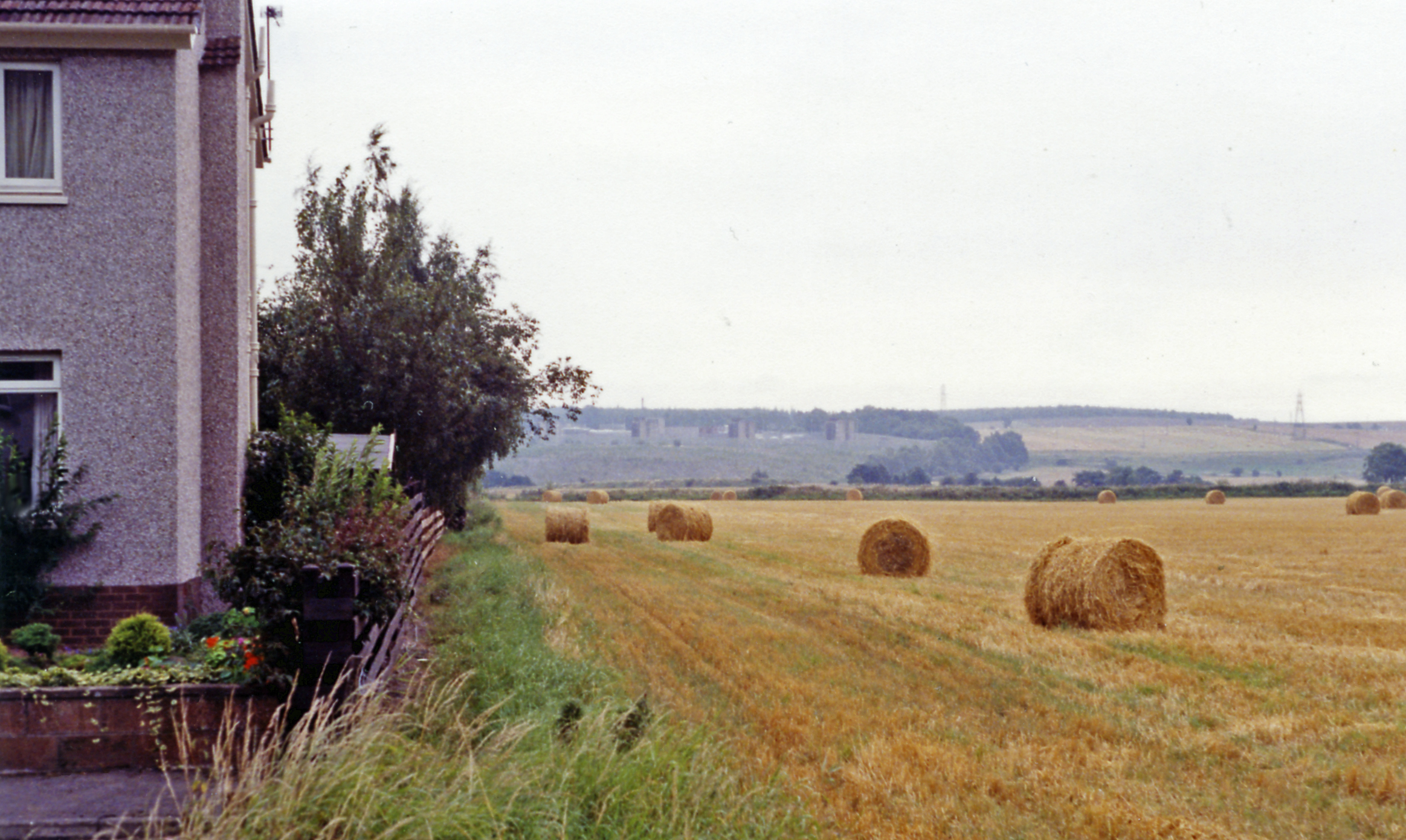
- Location of the former station (1991)

General information
- Location: Alva, Clackmannanshire; Scotland
- Platforms: 1

Other information
- Status: Disused

History
- Original company: Alva Railway
- Pre-grouping: North British Railway
- Post-grouping: London and North Eastern Railway

Key dates
- 3 June 1863: Station opens
- 1 November 1954: closed for passengers
- 1964: closed completely
Location

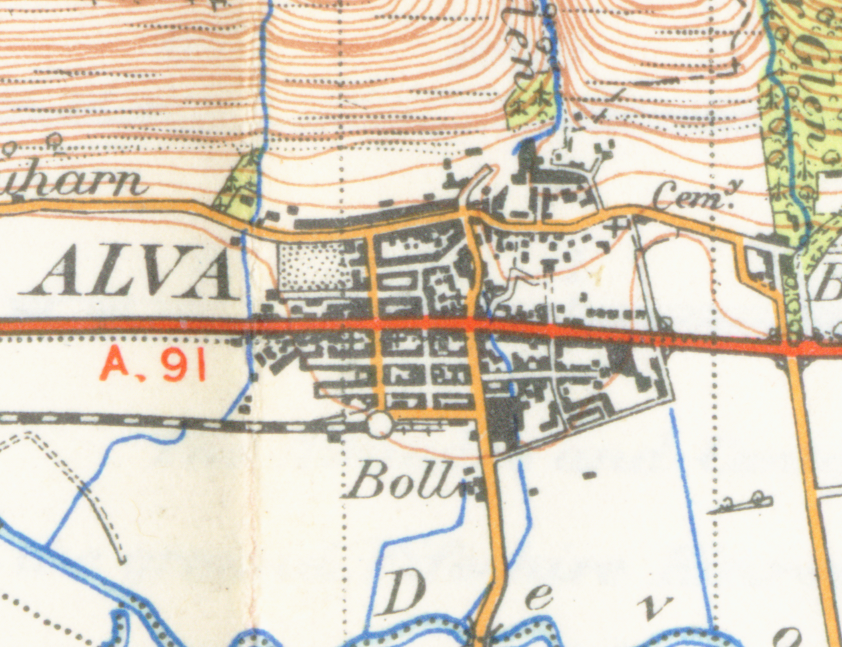
Map of Alva from 1945 showing site of station

Alva railway station was a station in the village of Alva, in the Scottish county of Clackmannanshire. The station was the terminus of a branch from Cambus on the Stirling to Dunfermline Lower line.

== History ==
Opened by the Alva Railway, as part of the North British Railway it became part of the London and North Eastern Railway during the Grouping of 1923, passing on to the Scottish Region of British Railways during the nationalisation of 1948. Passenger service was withdrawn by the British Transport Commission in 1954 and freight services in 1964

== The site today ==
The east of the site of the station has been overbuilt by a housing estate. In 2024, the west side of the site is a small copse of trees and a path. No remains of the station exist.

Preceding station	Historical railways	Following station
Menstrie and Glenochil	North British Railway; Alva Railway	Terminus
