= Alva, Clackmannanshire =

Coordinates: 56.153048°N 3.799565°W

Alva: Scottish Gaelic: Allmhagh Beag
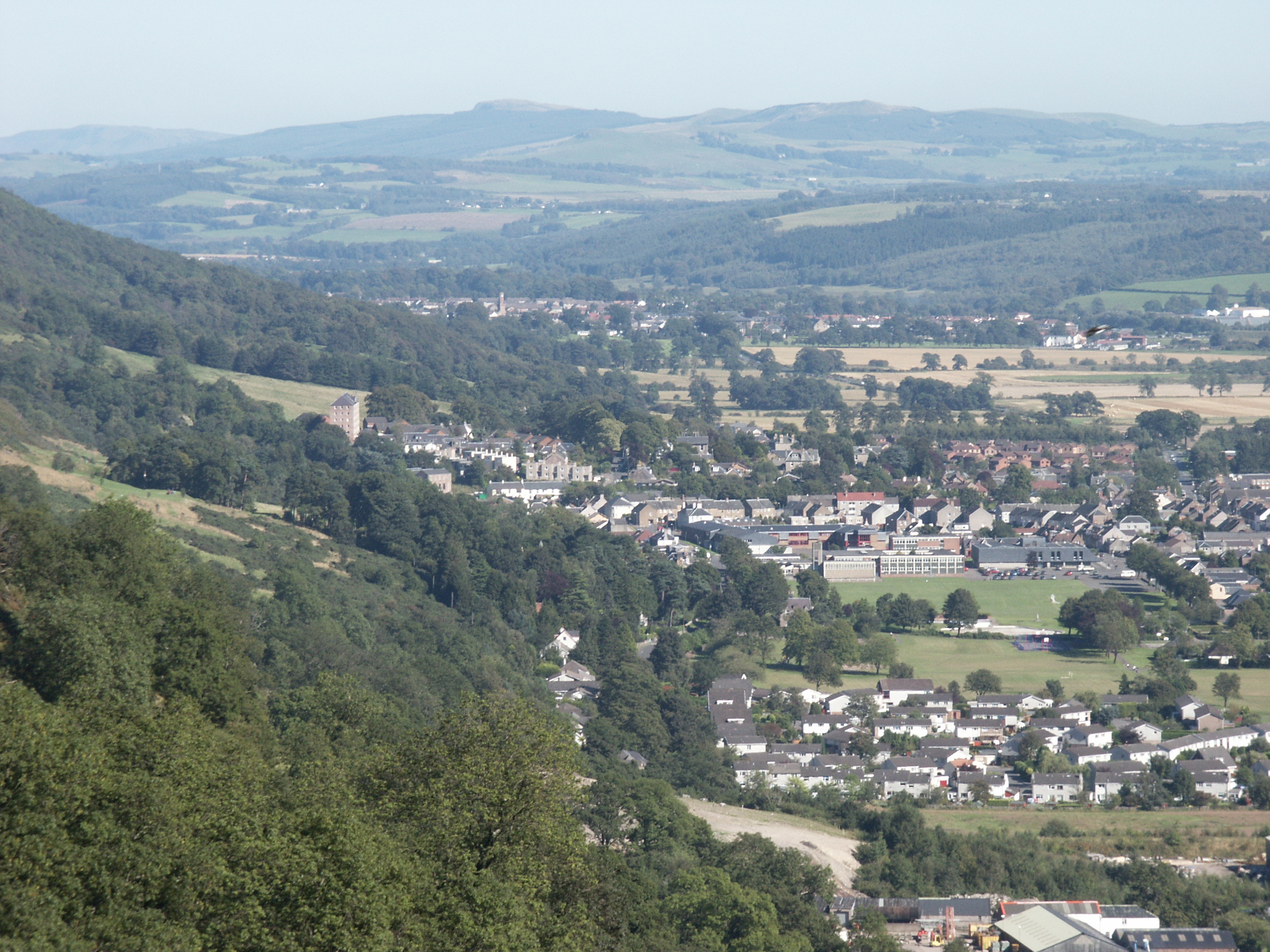
- A view of Alva from Myreton Hill, facing east.

- Location within Clackmannanshire
- Area: 0.598 sq mi (1.55 km^{2})
- Population: 4,630 (2020)
  - Density: 7,742/sq mi (2,989/km^{2})
- OS grid reference: NS882970
- Council area: Clackmannanshire
- Lieutenancy area: Clackmannanshire
- Country: Scotland
- Sovereign state: United Kingdom
- Post town: ALVA
- Postcode district: FK12
- Dialling code: 01259
- Police: Scotland
- Fire: Scottish
- Ambulance: Scottish
- UK Parliament: Alloa and Grangemouth
- Scottish Parliament: Clackmannanshire and Dunblane

Alva (Scottish Gaelic: Ailbheach, meaning rocky) is a small town in Clackmannanshire, set in the Central Lowlands of Scotland. It is one of a number of towns situated immediately to the south of the Ochil Hills, collectively referred to as the Hillfoots Villages or simply The Hillfoots. It is located between Tillicoultry and Menstrie. Alva had a resident population of 5,181 at the 2001 census but this has since been revised to 4,600 in 2016. It boasts many features such as a park with an event hall and a newly opened outdoor gym, and is the home of Alva Academy.

== Etymology ==
The name of this place, the orthography of which has successively passed through the different forms of Alueth, and Alvath or Alveth to that of Alva, is of Gaelic origin, and is supposed to be derived from the term Ailbheach, signifying "rocky."

== History ==
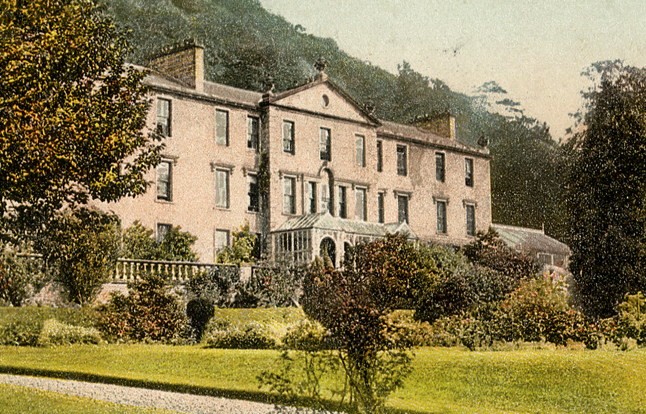
Alva House in its late 18th century form

The old town centred on Alva House, a tower house dating from 1542 and enlarged and remodelled in 1636 by Sir Charles Erskine. It remained in the Erskine family until sometime after 1802 when it passed to the mill owner James Johnstone. Alva House was requisitioned by the government during the Second World War and was used for target practice by local artillery battalions.

During the Industrial Revolution, Alva developed as a textile manufacturing centre; the woollen mills, originally water-powered, provided employment for locals and migrants to the area. The former Mill Trail Centre is next to the Cochrane Park, housed in the old Glentana Mill built in 1887. It housed permanent exhibitions about the history of the old woollen industry and the experiences of the many people employed in the industry. The Dalmore Works was built in 1874 for Wilson Brothers, who produced textile products including tweed, woollen novelty fabrics and mohair and woollen rugs. The works were operated by Wilsons until 1964, when the failure of Wilson Bros (Alva) Ltd, set up jointly with McBean and Bishop Ltd, caused the firm to lose the works.

Alva was historically in an exclave of Stirlingshire, but it was transferred to Clackmannanshire in 1891.

== Geography ==
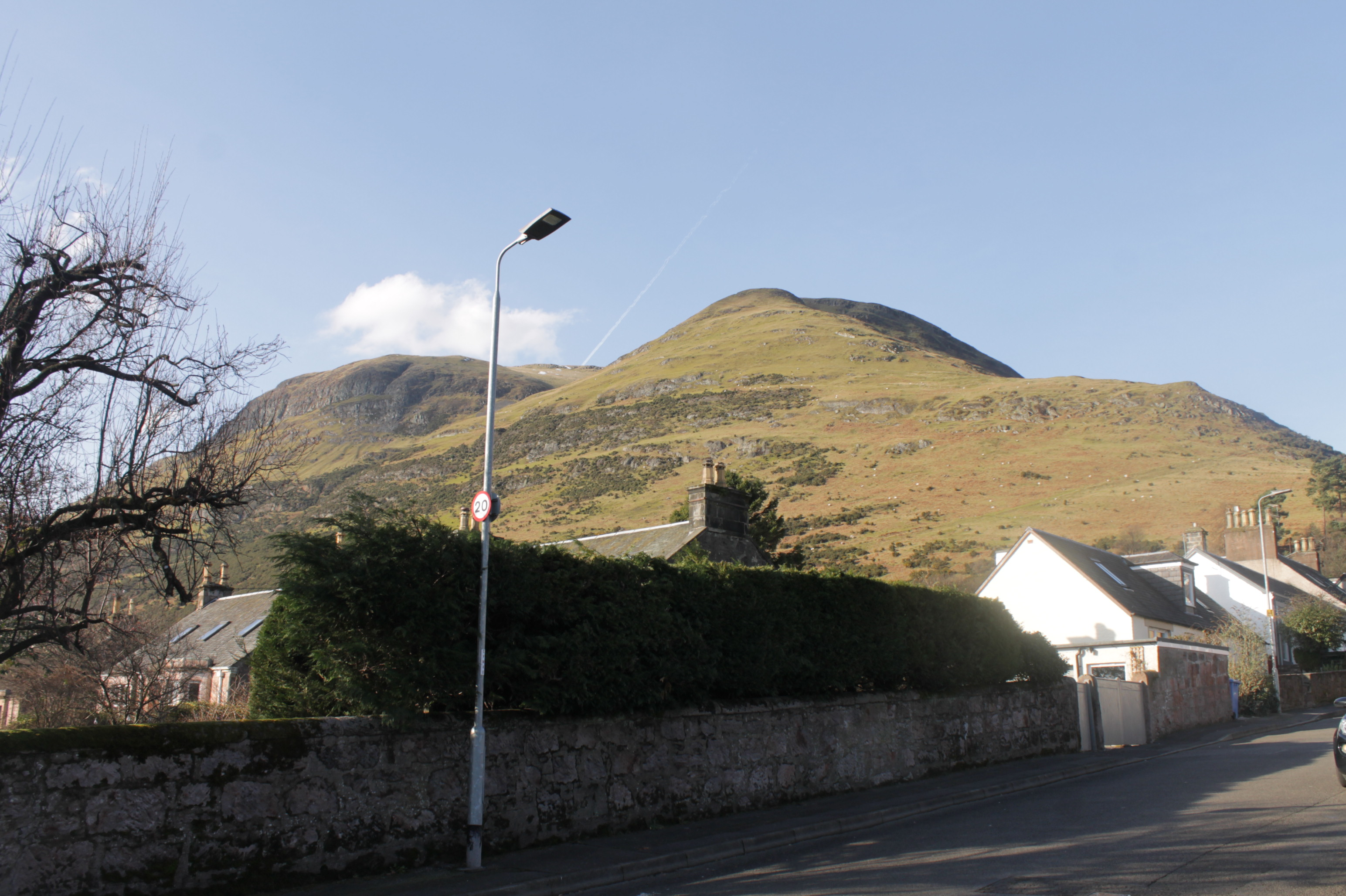
Wee Torry looming over Alva

Alva lies right at the foot of the Ochil Hills. The Ochil Fault, movement of which gave rise to the steep southern scarp of the Ochil Hills, coincides approximately with the old road along the base of the hills. The rock beneath the carse in this area is of Carboniferous age. The main hill dominating the town is Torry, with Craigleith adjacent to the west.

The town is situated on slightly higher ground than the surrounding carse, being on two overlapping alluvial fans, made up of material deposited by the Carnaughton Glen and Alva Glen burns. The spectacular Alva Glen cuts into the Ochils immediately north of the town. Alva Burn flows from the glen, through Alva, and into the River Devon.

To the east of Alva Glen, and parallel to it, is the Silver Glen, where silver was mined at one time. A more recent attempt about 1 km to the south of Alva, the Glenochil Colliery, was not a success, and the site is now the site of HM Prison Glenochil.

== Facilities ==
Alva has many shops, three Christian places of worship: a small but growing Baptist fellowship, a well established Church of Scotland and St. John Vianney's Roman Catholic Church; a few pubs, and a medical practice. There are two large parks - Johnstone Park and Cochrane Park, which contains the local hall (Cochrane Hall). Every second Saturday in July, Johnstone Park is host to the Alva Games, the last remaining Highland Games show in Clackmannanshire. The McArthur Braes, at the foot of Alva Glen, was once a formal park that has fallen into neglect; it is now being regenerated.

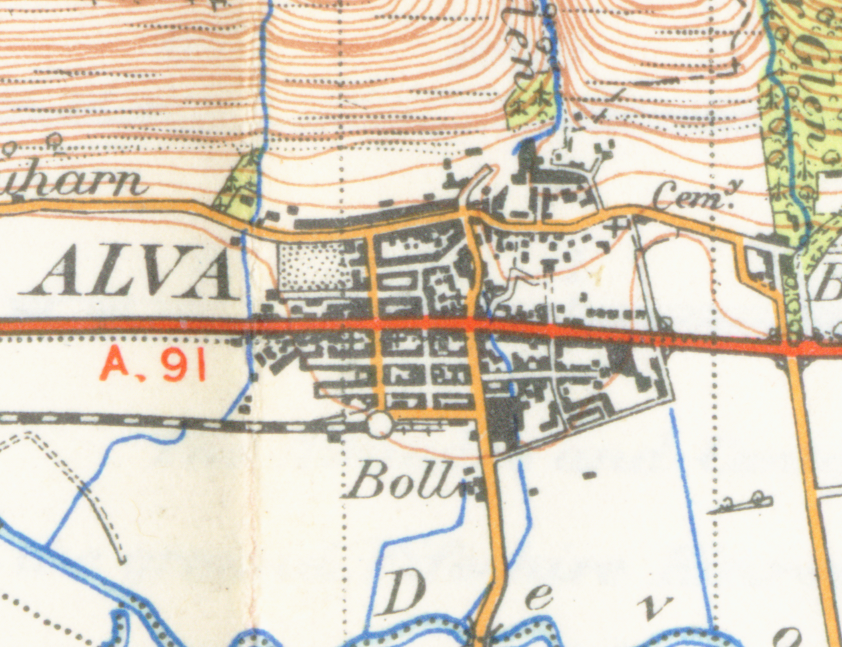
Map of Alva from 1945

The town has both a primary school and a secondary school. Alva Academy takes pupils from several primary schools in the Hillfoots area. The school was relocated on a new campus early in 2009. The new Alva Academy has been built at the end of Greenhead, a street on the south-east side of the town.

== Transport ==
Alva is on the main A91 Stirling to St Andrews road. Bus services run to Stirling and to Alloa (via Tillicoultry), and (less frequently) to St Andrews.

There was once a railway station that served the town from 1863 to 1954.

== Recreation ==
In 1856, a gathering was organised in a park for gymnastics that evolved into an annual Alva Games.

Between 1937 and 1954, Alva Glen was famed for its annual Illuminations, which drew visitors from across Scotland. In 2004 the Illuminations were revived.

== Economy and industry ==
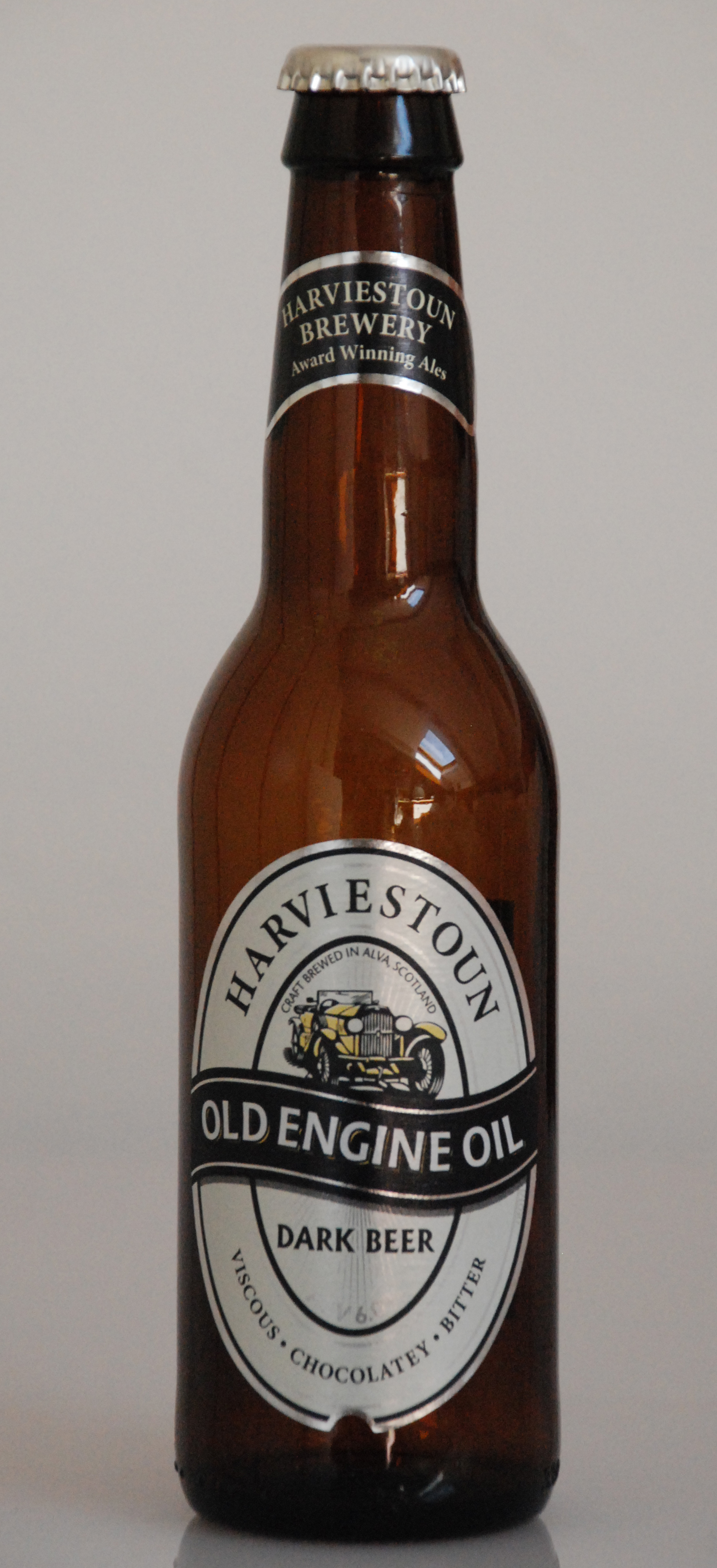
A bottle of Old Engine Oil

=== Harviestoun Brewery ===
Harviestoun is a small Scottish brewery founded in 1983 by Ken Brooker in a 200-year-old stone barn on a farm on the Harviestoun estate near Dollar. It moved in 2004 to Alva Industrial Estate in Alva, before being bought by Caledonian Brewery in 2006. It became independent again in 2008 – when Caledonian was bought by Scottish & Newcastle, Sandy Orr & Donald MacDonald saw Harviestoun as a valuable asset and decided to purchase the brewery and run it independently.

Harviestoun Brewery produces a variety of beers in keg, cask, bottle and can. The most notable brews include Schiehallion Craft Lager, Bitter & Twisted Golden Ale, Old Engine Oil Black Ale, Ola Dubh Whisky Barrel Aged Ale.

== Architecture ==
The most prominent building in Alva is Strude Mill, a former woollen mill that has been restored and converted to flats. It stands above the town at the base of the hills, and is clearly visible from some distance away.

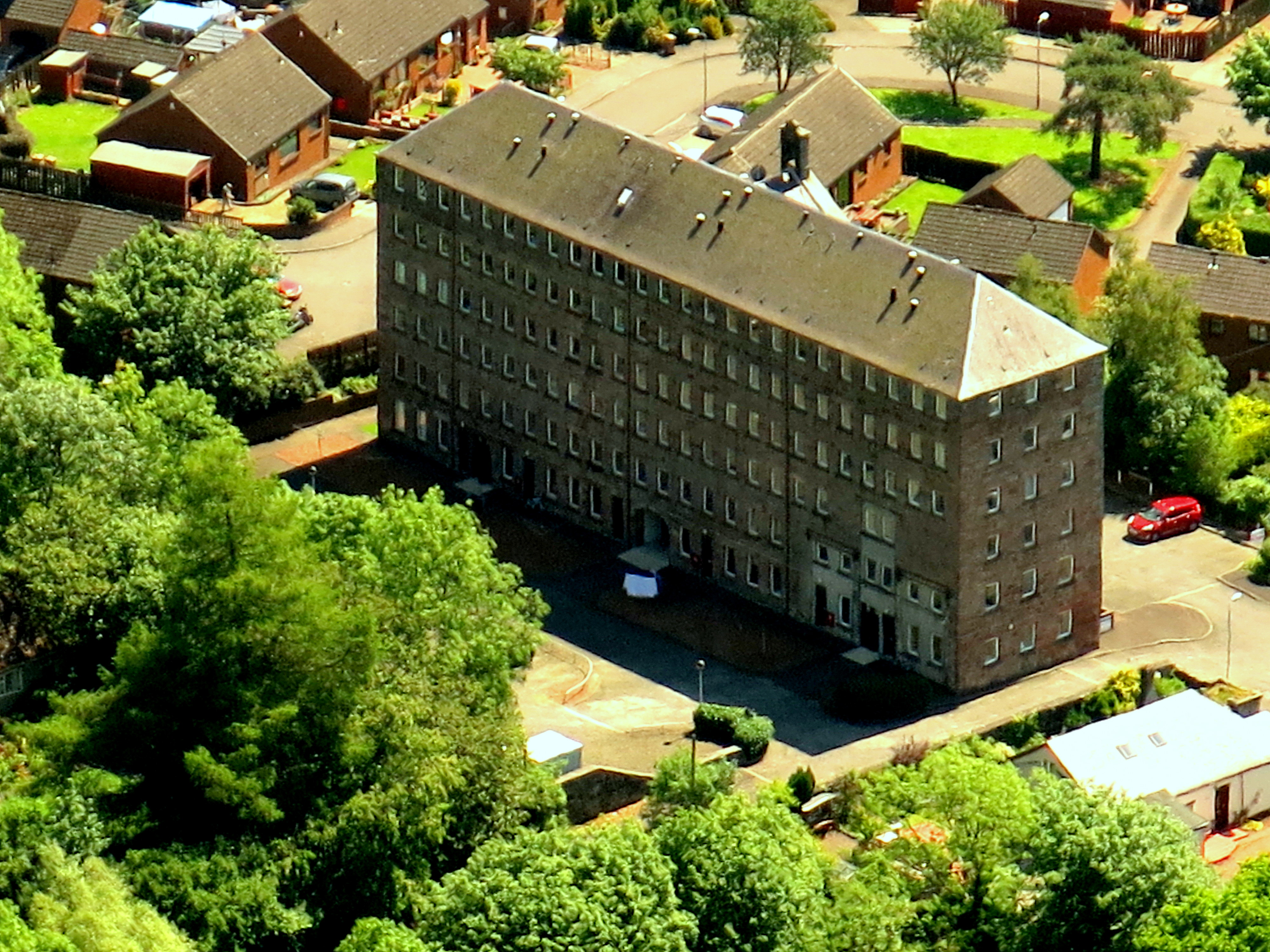
Strude Mill in 2014

== Notable residents ==
- John Eadie (1810–1876) Moderator of the General Assembly for the United Presbyterian Church of Scotland 1857/8
- Robert Erskine (physician) (1677–1718) physician to Tsar Peter the Great, head and reformer of the Russian medical service, founder of botanic gardens in Moscow and St Petersburg
