= Sheriffmuir =

Battlefield location in Stirling, Scotland

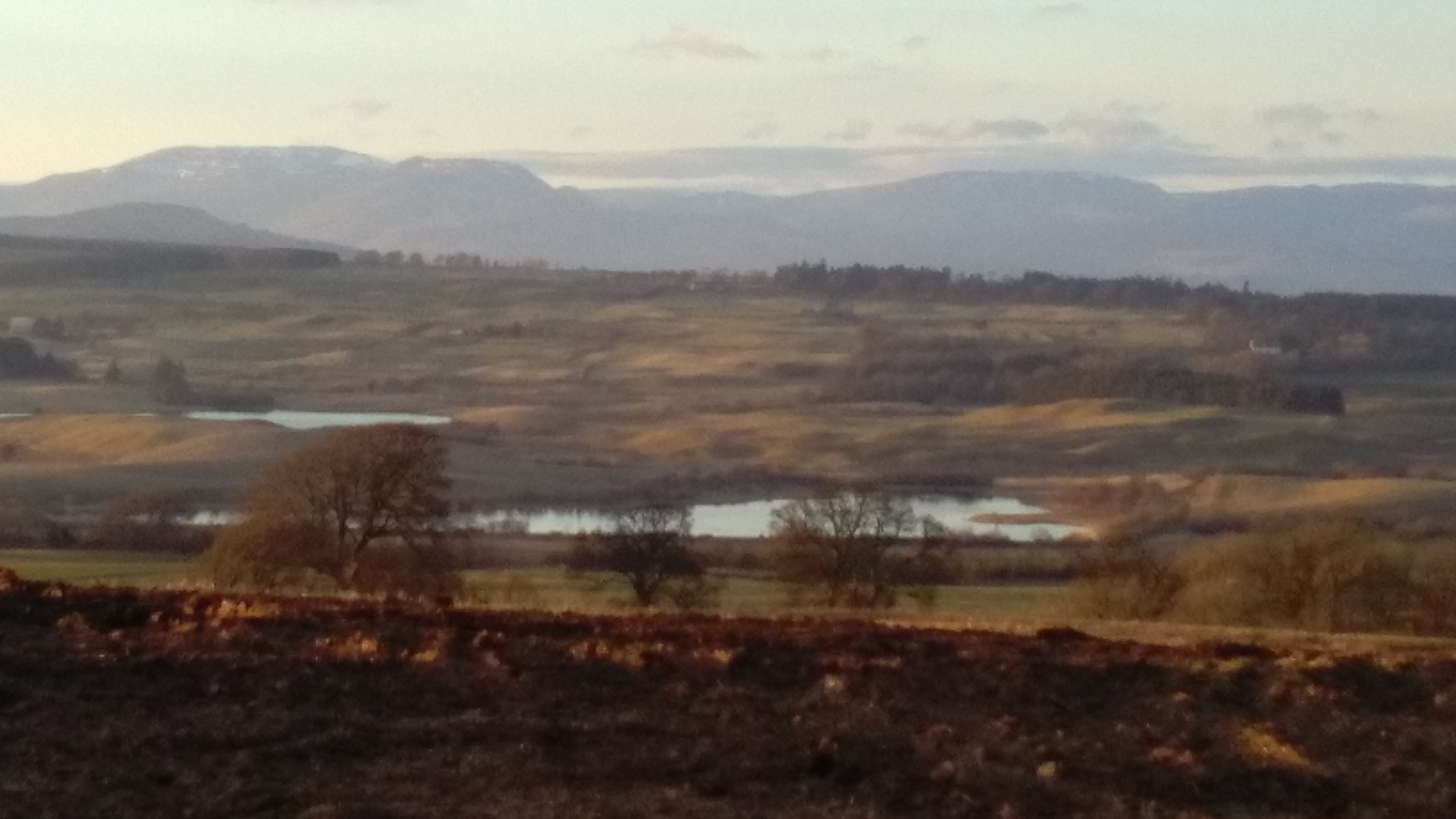
Sheriffmuir looking north

Sheriffmuir (Scots: Sherramuir; Scottish Gaelic: Sliabh an t-Siorraim), the site of the inconclusive 1715 Battle of Sheriffmuir (part of the Jacobite rising of 1715), lies on the slopes of the Ochil Hills, just inside the Perthshire border in Scotland. The "Sheriffmuir Inn", which overlooks the battle site, used to house Hercules the wrestling bear for which it is well known.

Single-track roads from the site lead to Dunblane, Greenloaning, Stirling and the A9 near Blackford. A monument to the battle stands next to the Dunblane road a few hundred yards from the site. Part of the British comedy film Monty Python and the Holy Grail was filmed there.
