= Cairns (disambiguation) =

Cairns is a city in Queensland, Australia.

Cairns may also refer to:

== Places ==
=== Australia ===
- Cairns Region, a local government area in Queensland, Australia, established in 2008
- Cairns City, Queensland, a suburb at the centre of Cairns in Queensland, Australia
- City of Cairns, a local government area in Queensland, Australia, from 1985 to 1995
- Electoral district of Cairns, a district in the Legislative Assembly of Queensland

=== Elsewhere ===
- Cairns (Martian crater), on Mars
- Cairns, an area of Halfway, South Lanarkshire, Scotland
- The Cairns, a mixed-use district under development in Sandy, Utah, U.S.
- Cairns of Coll, a region of rocky outcrops on the island of Coll, Inner Hebrides, Scotland

== People ==
- Aiden Cairns (1917–1992), Australian rugby league player
- Alan Cairns (1930–2018), Canadian political science professor
- Alun Cairns (born 1970), Welsh politician
- Andrew Cairns (rugby union) (born 1967), Australian rugby player
- Andrew Cairns (politician) (born 1912 or 1913), Northern Irish politician
- Andy Cairns (born 1965), Northern Irish musician
- Buster Cairns (1925–2010), Canadian soccer player
- Chris Cairns (born 1970), New Zealand cricketer, son of Lance Cairns
- David Cairns (disambiguation)
- Davie Cairns (born 1951), Scottish footballer
- Don Cairns (born 1955), Canadian ice hockey player
- Douglas Cairns (born 1961), Scottish classical scholar
- Eric Cairns (born 1974), Canadian former ice hockey player and director of player development for the New York Islanders
- Fred Cairns (1857–1896), British entertainer
- George Albert Cairns (1913–1944), British recipient of the Victoria Cross
- Graeme Cairns (born c. 1957), New Zealand musician
- Holly Cairns (born 1989), Irish Social Democrat politician
- Hugh Cairns, 1st Earl Cairns (1819–1885), Lord Chancellor of Great Britain
- Hugh Cairns (surgeon) (1896–1952), British surgeon
- Hugh Cairns (VC) (1896–1918), Canadian recipient of the Victoria Cross
- Ian Cairns (born 1952), former World Champion surfer
- Imogen Cairns (born 1989), British gymnast
- Jim Cairns (1914–2003), Australian politician
- John Cairns (disambiguation)
- Kevin Cairns (footballer) (1937–2017), English footballer
- Kevin Cairns (politician) (1929–1984)
- Lance Cairns (born 1949), New Zealand cricketer, father of Chris Cairns
- Leah Cairns (born 1974), Canadian actress
- Mark Cairns (footballer) (born 1969), Scottish football goalkeeper
- Mark Cairns (squash player) (born 1967), English squash player
- Matt Cairns (born 1979), English rugby union player
- Rachael Cairns (born 1988), British actress
- Ronnie Cairns, English footballer
- Ryan Cairns (born 1984), Zimbabwean golfer
- Sally Cairns (1919–1965), American film actress
- Scott Cairns (born 1954), American poet
- Stephen D. Cairns (born 1949), American zoologist
- Tommy Cairns (1892–1967), Scottish footballer
- Warwick Cairns (born 1962), British author
- Wilfred Cairns, 4th Earl Cairns (1865–1946)
- William Cairns (1828–1888), British colonial administrator
- Clan Cairns, a Scottish clan

== Other uses ==
- Cairns (sculpture), a 2008 work by Christine Bourdette in Portland, Oregon, US
- HMAS Cairns, a ship, and a shore establishment, of the Royal Australian Navy

== See also ==
- Cairns Group, an interest group of 19 nations
- Cairn (disambiguation)
- Cairnes (surname)
- McCairns
