= Cairn (disambiguation) =

A cairn is a man-made pile of stones.

Cairn may also refer to:

== Places ==
- Cairn O' Mounth (Scottish Gaelic: Càrn Mhon), a high mountain pass in Aberdeenshire, Scotland
- Cairn Toul (from the Gaelic Càrn an t-Sabhail, "Hill of the barn"), the 4th highest mountain in Scotland and the 2nd highest point in the western massif of the Cairngorms
- Cairnbaan (Scottish Gaelic: An Càrn Bàn), a village in Argyll and Bute, western Scotland.
- Cairness House, a country house in Aberdeenshire, Scotland, built in the 1790s in the Neoclassical style
- Cairneyhill, a small village near Dunfermline in west Fife, Scotland
- Cairngaan, Wigtownshire, the southernmost settlement in Scotland
- Cairnie Hill, a hill in the Ochils, in Fife, Scotland
- Cairnlea, Victoria, a suburb of Melbourne in Australia
- Cairn na Burgh Mòr (English: Cairnburgh More), one of the Treshnish Isles in the Inner Hebrides of Scotland
- Cairnpapple Hill, a major Neolithic and Bronze Age ritual site in central lowland Scotland
- Cairnryan (Scots: The Cairn, Scottish Gaelic: Machair an Sgithich), a small village in Dumfries and Galloway, Scotland
- Cairn University, a private Christian university in Langhorne Manor, Pennsylvania
- Cairn Water, a river in Dumfries and Galloway, Scotland
- Carn Clonhugh (Irish: Carn Clainne Aodha or Sliabh Cairbré), a hill in County Longford, Republic of Ireland
- Carncastle or Cairncastle, a small village and civil parish in County Antrim, Northern Ireland

== People ==
- John Elliott Cairnes (1823–1875), an Irish economist, described as the "last of the classical economists"

== Arts, entertainment, and media ==
- Cairn.info, a French-language web portal of scholarly materials in the humanities and social sciences
- Cairn, 2021 album by Fergus McCreadie
- Cairn (video game), a 2026 video game

== Other uses ==
- Cairn circle, another name for a bowl barrow, a type of Neolithic and Bronze Age burial mound or tumulus
- Cairn Energy, one of Europe's leading independent oil and gas exploration and development companies
- Cairn Terrier, one of the oldest of the terrier breeds, originating in the Scottish Highlands and recognized as one of Scotland's earliest working dogs
- Cairn Valley Light Railway, a former rural railway line built to connect the Cairn Valley with the main railway network at Dumfries, closed in the 1940s

== See also ==
- Cairn Hill (disambiguation)
- Cairncross (disambiguation)
- Cairngorm (disambiguation)
- Cairns (disambiguation)
- Carn
