= Cairngorm =

Cairngorm or Cairngorms may refer to:

== Places ==
- Cairngorm (Alberta), a mountain in Jasper National Park, Canada
- Cairn Gorm, a mountain in the Scottish Highlands, after which the Cairngorms are named
  - Cairngorm Mountain Railway
  - Cairngorm Mountain ski resort, a ski and snowboarding recreation area on Cairn Gorm
- Cairngorms, a mountain range in the Scottish Highlands
  - Cairngorms National Park, a national park in Cairngorms, Scotland
  - Cairngorm Lochs, a protected wetland area in the Cairngorms
- Cairngorm, a community in Strathroy-Caradoc, Ontario, Canada
- Cairngorm Lake, source of the Steel River (Ontario), Canada

== Other ==
- Cairngorm (Flex framework), one of the primary open-source software frameworks for application architecture in Adobe Flex
- Cairngorm (horse) (foaled 1902), an American Thoroughbred racehorse
- Cairngorm (mineral), a form of smoky quartz, found in the Cairngorms
- Cairngorm Brewery, a brewery in Aviemore, Scotland
- Cairngorm Club, a mountaineering club in Aberdeen, Scotland
- The Cairngorms (book}

== See also ==
- Cairn (disambiguation)
- Cairns (disambiguation)
- Loch Gorm Castle
