= List of Scottish counties by highest point =

This is a list of the 33 counties of Scotland by their highest point.

Rank	County	Height	Name	National Grid reference
1	Inverness-shire	1,345 m (4,413 ft)	Ben Nevis	NN166712
2=	Aberdeenshire	1,309 m (4,295 ft)	Ben Macdhui	NN988989
2=	Banffshire	1,309 m (4,295 ft)	Ben Macdhui	NN988989
4	Perthshire	1,214 m (3,983 ft)	Ben Lawers	NN635414
5	Ross and Cromarty (Note: Abolished as a county in 1890, Cromartyshire was a distinct county consisting chiefly of the Black Isle, with the county town of Cromarty, and the district of Ullapool, with a number of enclaves scattered in the body of Ross-shire, in between. The highest point of the County of Cromarty is Sgurr Mor in the Fannichs at OS grid reference NH200694. It is 1,110 m high - which would have made it 7th in the list)	1,183 m (3,881 ft)	Carn Eige	NH123261
6	Argyll	1,150 m (3,770 ft)	Bidean nam Bian	NN143542
7	Angus	1,068 m (3,504 ft)	Glas Maol	NO166765
8	Sutherland	998 m (3,274 ft)	Ben More Assynt	NC318201
9	Stirlingshire	974 m (3,196 ft)	Ben Lomond	NN367028
10	Dunbartonshire	943 m (3,094 ft)	Ben Vorlich	NN295124
11	Bute	874 m (2,867 ft)	Goat Fell	NR991415
12	Kirkcudbrightshire	843 m (2,766 ft)	Merrick	NX427855
13	Peeblesshire	840 m (2,760 ft)	Broad Law	NT146235
14	Dumfriesshire	821 m (2,694 ft)	White Coomb	NT163151
15	Ayrshire	782 m (2,566 ft)	Kirriereoch Hill shoulder	NX421870
16	Kincardineshire	778 m (2,552 ft)	Mount Battock	NO549844
17	Lanarkshire	748 m (2,454 ft)	Culter Fell	NT052290
18	Selkirkshire	744 m (2,441 ft)	Dun Rig	NT253315
19	Roxburghshire	743 m (2,438 ft)	Cairn Hill West Top (Hangingstone Hill)	NT895193
20	Clackmannanshire	721 m (2,365 ft)	Ben Cleuch	NN902006
21	Moray	710 m (2,330 ft)	Carn a' Ghille Chearr	NJ139298
22	Caithness	706 m (2,316 ft)	Morven	ND004285
23	Nairnshire	659 m (2,162 ft)	Carn Glas-choire	NH891291
24	Midlothian	651 m (2,136 ft)	Blackhope Scar	NT315483
25	West Lothian	562 m (1,844 ft)	West Cairn Hill	NT107584
26	East Lothian	535 m (1,755 ft)	Meikle Says Law	NT581617
27	Berwickshire	532 m (1,745 ft)	Meikle Says Law shoulder	NT581616
28=	Fife	522 m (1,713 ft)	West Lomond	NO197066
29=	Renfrewshire	522 m (1,713 ft)	Hill of Stake	NS273630
30	Kinross-shire	497 m (1,631 ft)	Innerdouny Hill	NO032073
31	Orkney	481 m (1,578 ft)	Ward Hill	HY228022
32	Shetland	450 m (1,480 ft)	Ronas Hill	HU305834
33	Wigtownshire	322 m (1,056 ft)	Craigairie Fell	NX236736

== See also ==
- List of counties of Scotland 1890–1975
