= Avielochan =

Hamlet in Highland, Scotland

Coordinates: 57.2280°N 3.8177°W

Avielochan: Scottish Gaelic: Aghaidh an Lochain
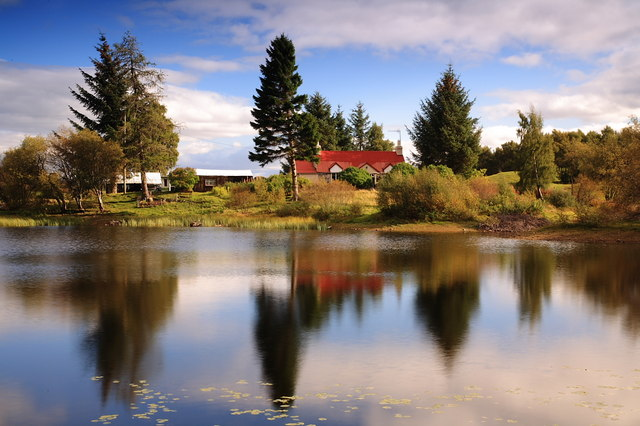

- Location within the Badenoch and Strathspey area
- OS grid reference: NH905165
- Council area: Highland
- Country: Scotland
- Sovereign state: United Kingdom
- Police: Scotland
- Fire: Scottish
- Ambulance: Scottish
- UK Parliament: Moray West, Nairn and Strathspey Caithness, Sutherland and Easter Ross
- Scottish Parliament: Skye, Lochaber and Badenoch

Avielochan (Scottish Gaelic: Aghaidh an Lochain) is a hamlet in the historical county of Inverness-shire, within the Highland council area of Scotland. It is located north of Aviemore, on the A9 road. The area is noted for its prehistoric cairn.

== Geography and wildlife ==
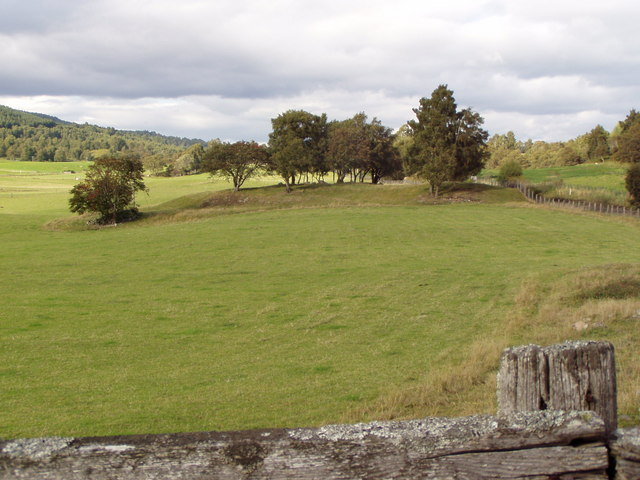
Near the cairn

Avielochan is located in Strathspey in central, northern Scotland, within the Cairngorms National Park. The village is located south of Kinveachy and north of Granish. The settlement takes its name from the body of water Avie Lochan (meaning "the small lake of Avie) archaically named Loch-na- mhoon, measuring about 90 yards long, and 50 across. Prior to the great floods in 1829, there was a floating island on the loch measuring about 30 yards across. It attracts ospreys during the spring and summer months and goldeneye, coot and Slavonian grebe, amongst others. Red squirrel, red deer, roe deer, black grouse and capercaillie inhabit the area.

== Buildings ==
Avelochan Farm lets out self-catering cottages during the warmer months of the year to tourists. The farm itself covers an area of 270 hectares, with arable fields, rough grazing and woodland. At certain times in the year it has around 80 cattle and some 60 Cheviot ewes which are crossed with a Suffolk tup before they are sold in early autumn. One building of note is Clach Mhor (meaning 'big stone' in Gaelic) which is located on the edge of the village.

== Chamber tomb ==
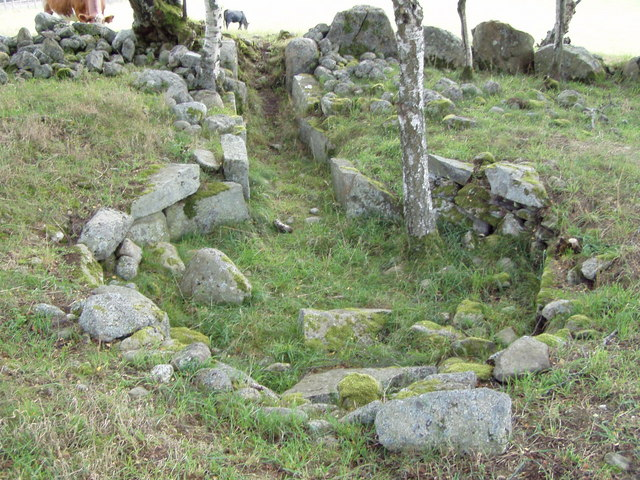
Remains of a chambered cairn by Avielochan

The area is noted for its prehistoric chamber tomb stones which are said to be particularly old by some sources, although they have not been dated reliably. The site contains a cairn which is very circular in shape except for a slight flattening at the entrance, where part of a lignite amulet has been unearthed. The tumulus is about 40 feet in diameter.

The cairn is said to be "aligned" with Glen Einich, and has views of the Cairngorm Mountains.
