= Kevin Cairns =

Kevin Cairns may refer to:

- Kevin Cairns (footballer) (1937–2017), English footballer
- Kevin Cairns (politician) (1929–1984), Australian politician
