= Ochil Hills =

Range of hills in Scotland

Coordinates: 56°13′43″N 3°40′01″W

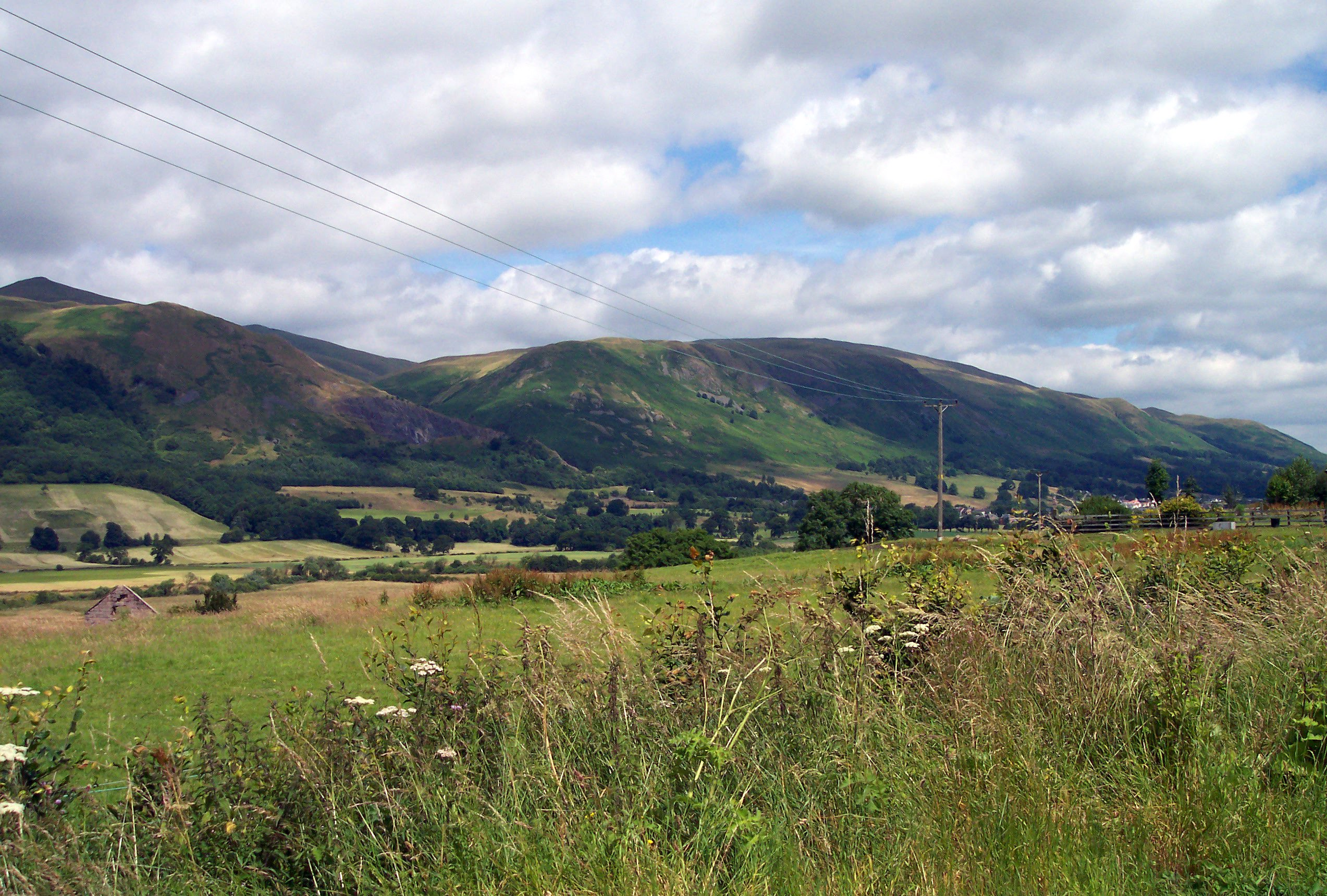
Ochil Hills (Wood Hill and Elistoun Hill) viewed from south-west of Tillicoultry

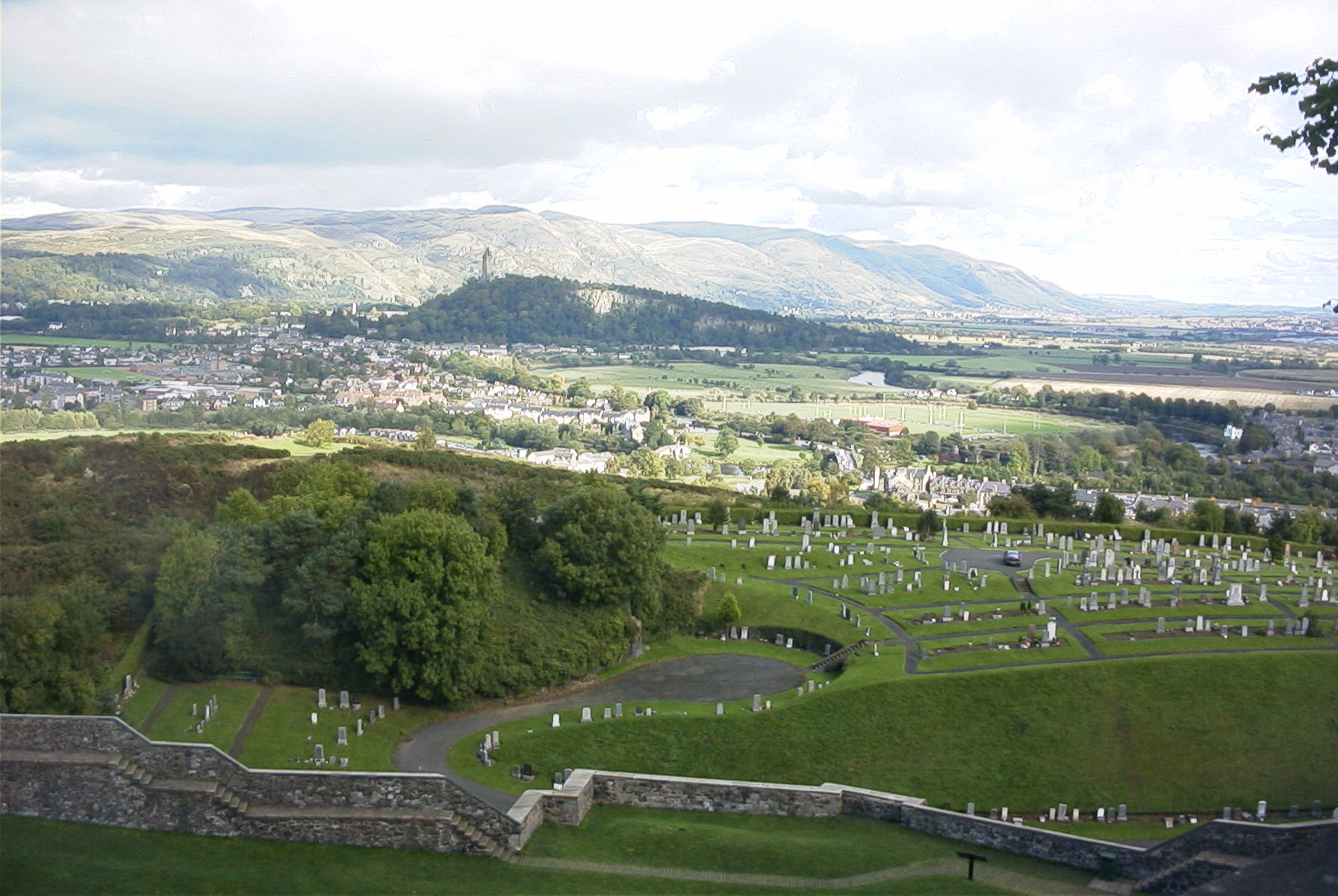
Ochil Hills viewed from Stirling Castle. The scarp face formed by the line of the Ochil Fault can be seen clearly. The Abbey Craig is in the middle distance.

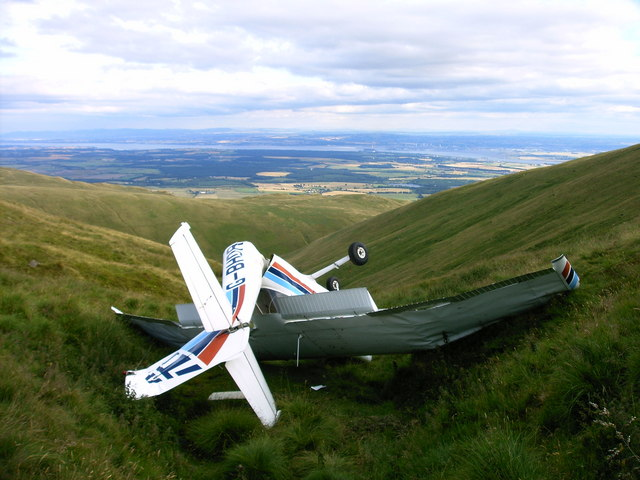
A downed Cessna 152, lying between Andrew Gannel Hill and The Law, in 2006. The pilot was not injured in the crash

The Ochil Hills (/ˈoʊxəl/; Scottish Gaelic: Monadh Oicheal) is a range of hills in Scotland north of the Forth valley bordered by the cities of Stirling, Perth and the towns of Alloa, Kinross, and Auchterarder . The only major roads crossing the hills pass through Glen Devon/Glen Eagles and Glenfarg, the latter now largely replaced except for local traffic by the M90 Edinburgh-Perth motorway cutting through the eastern foothills. The hills are part of a Devonian lava extrusion whose appearance today is largely due to the Ochil Fault which results in the southern face of the hills forming an escarpment. The plateau is undulating with no prominent peak, the highest point being Ben Cleuch (Beinn Cloiche) at 721 m (2,365 ft). The south-flowing burns have cut deep ravines including Dollar Glen, Silver Glen and Alva Glen, often only passable with the aid of wooden walkways.

The extent of the Ochils is not well-defined but by some definitions continues to include the hills of north Fife.

== History ==
Historically, the hills, combined with the town's site at the lowest bridging-point on the River Forth, led to Stirling's importance as a main gateway to the Highlands. They also acted as a boundary with Fife. Castle Campbell was built at the head of Dollar Glen in the late 15th century (an earlier castle on the site had been called "Castle Gloom") mainly as a very visible symbol of the Campbell domination of the area. Sheriffmuir, the site of the 1715 battle of the Jacobite rising, is on the northern slopes of the hills. In the early Industrial Revolution, several mill towns such as Tillicoultry, Alva and Menstrie (the Hillfoots Villages) grew up in the shadow of the Ochils to tap the water power. Some of the mills are open today as museums.

Blairdenon Hill was the site of one of the Beacons of Dissent during the G8 protests in July 2005.

== Etymology ==
The name Ochil, recorded as Okhel in the 13th Century, is of Pictish origin. The name may involve *ogel meaning, "a ridge". It is less likely that the name involves the adjective *uchel meaning "high, tall" (cf. Welsh uchel).

== Geology ==
The Ochils are formed from a thick wedge of Devonian age volcanic and volcano-sedimentary rocks, rising up from below the lower Old Red Sandstone sedimentary rocks to the north and terminated to the south by the major southerly downthrowing Ochil Fault.

The Ochil Volcanic Formation, a sub-unit of the Arbuthnott-Garvock Group, consists of basaltic andesite and trachyandesite lavas and related rock types erupted during the Early Devonian epoch. Parts of the lower slopes on the northern side around Blackford and Auchterarder are formed from a volcanic conglomerate. It is intruded by numerous dykes of micridiorite of Silurian/Devonian age which form a part of the North Britain Siluro-Devonian Calc-alkaline Dyke Suite. Intrusions of both mafic and felsic character are also found. The whole massif is heavily faulted with some valleys such as Alva Glen and Glen Sherup having been eroded along these lines. Glacial till covers much of the lower ground around and within the range and peat accumulations occur on the plateau surface particularly in the west.

== Pictish folklore of the hills ==
Ancient folklore and historical documentation suggests that the Ochils once were inhabited by the Picts, or at least that a few Pictish settlements existed in the Ochil Hills. Castle Craig, a ruined ancient fort above the village of Mill Glen destroyed by industrial quarrying, was mentioned by local historian William Gibson in 1883 as being "a round Pictish fortress, the traces of which can still be distinctly seen." Old lore also told that some of the stones from the fort of Castle Craig were used in the construction of Stirling Castle, 7 3/4 miles (12.5 kilometres) to the west.

Another item of folklore existing in the Ochil Hills is Katie Thirsty's Well, a sacred well shrouded in mythology (OS Grid Reference – NS 81787 97653). Local historians have struggled to discover exactly the identity of "Katie Thirsty", but Pictish researcher Ronald Henderson argues that "the name derives from a corruption of both St. Katherine of Alexandria [Katie] and the Pictish King, Drust or Drustan [Thirsty]." He goes on to say "that the great crags of Dumyat less than a mile to the east is universally credited with being the last Pictish stronghold at the old hillfort there."

== Windfarm in the Ochil Hills ==
An 18-turbine development, approved in June 2006, has been constructed at Green Knowes, south of Auchterarder, north of Glendevon about 400 m (1,300 ft) north of the Ben Thrush summit. Following approval in early 2007, the construction of a wind farm consisting of thirteen 102 m (335 ft) turbines on Burnfoot Hill, which lies north of Tillicoultry and Ben Cleuch and to the south of the Upper Glendevon Reservoir has been completed. The site consists of fifteen 2 MW and six 2.05 MW turbines with a tip height of 100 m (330 ft). The windfarm is owned and run by EDF Renewables, who support the work of the Ochils Mountain Rescue Team through the Burnfoot Hill Community Fund with an annual donation of £5,000 guaranteed till 2039.

== Ochils Mountain Rescue Team ==
The Ochil Hills are home to the Ochils Mountain Rescue Team (founded in 1971), a local division of the Mountain Rescue Committee of Scotland. The Ochils Mountain Rescue Team consists of 35 volunteer mountaineers with specialist training who "locate and recover people who find themselves in difficult situations in the outdoors."

== List of peaks in the Ochil Hills ==
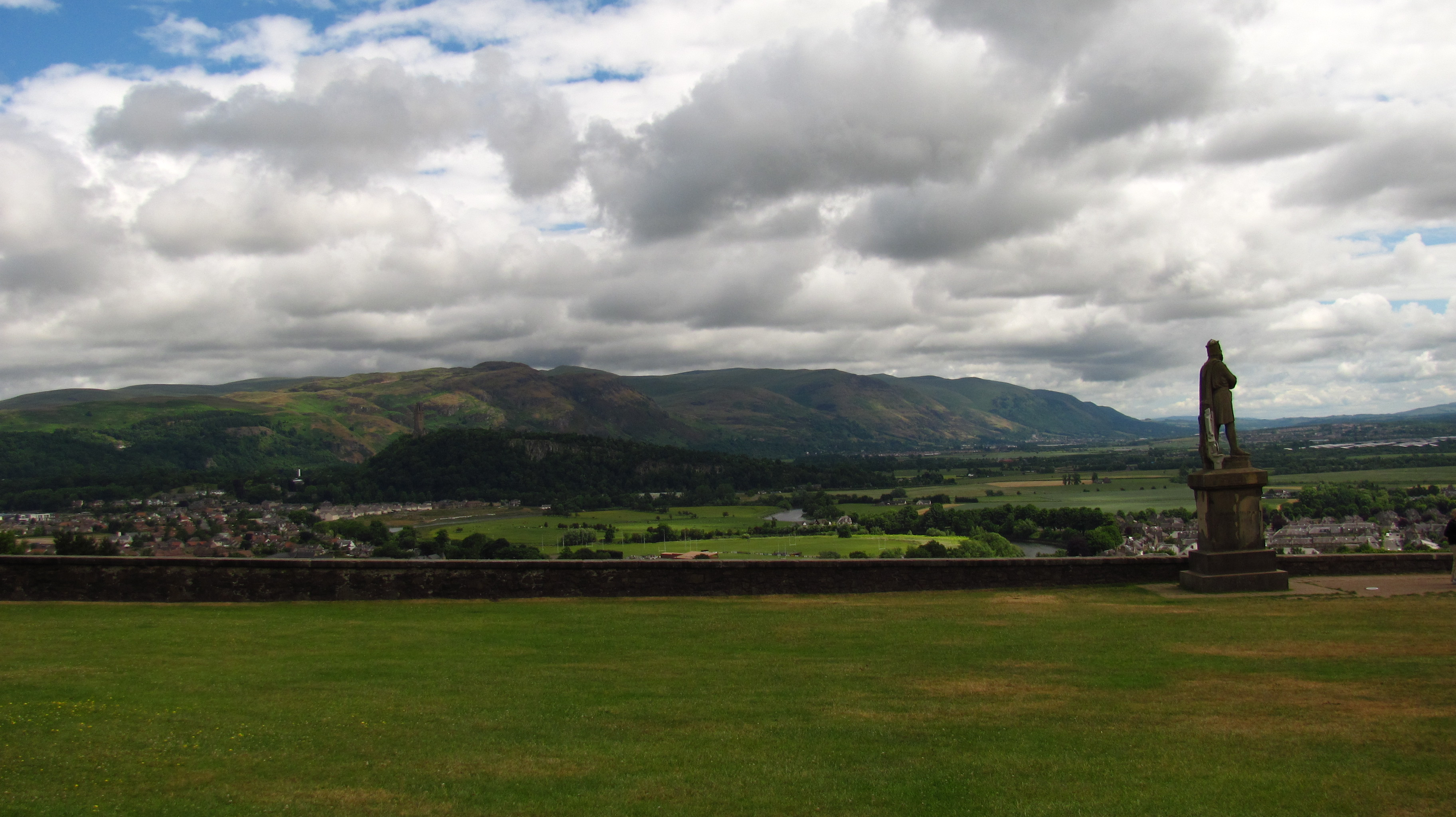
Ochil Hills and statue of Robert the Bruce as seen from Stirling Castle

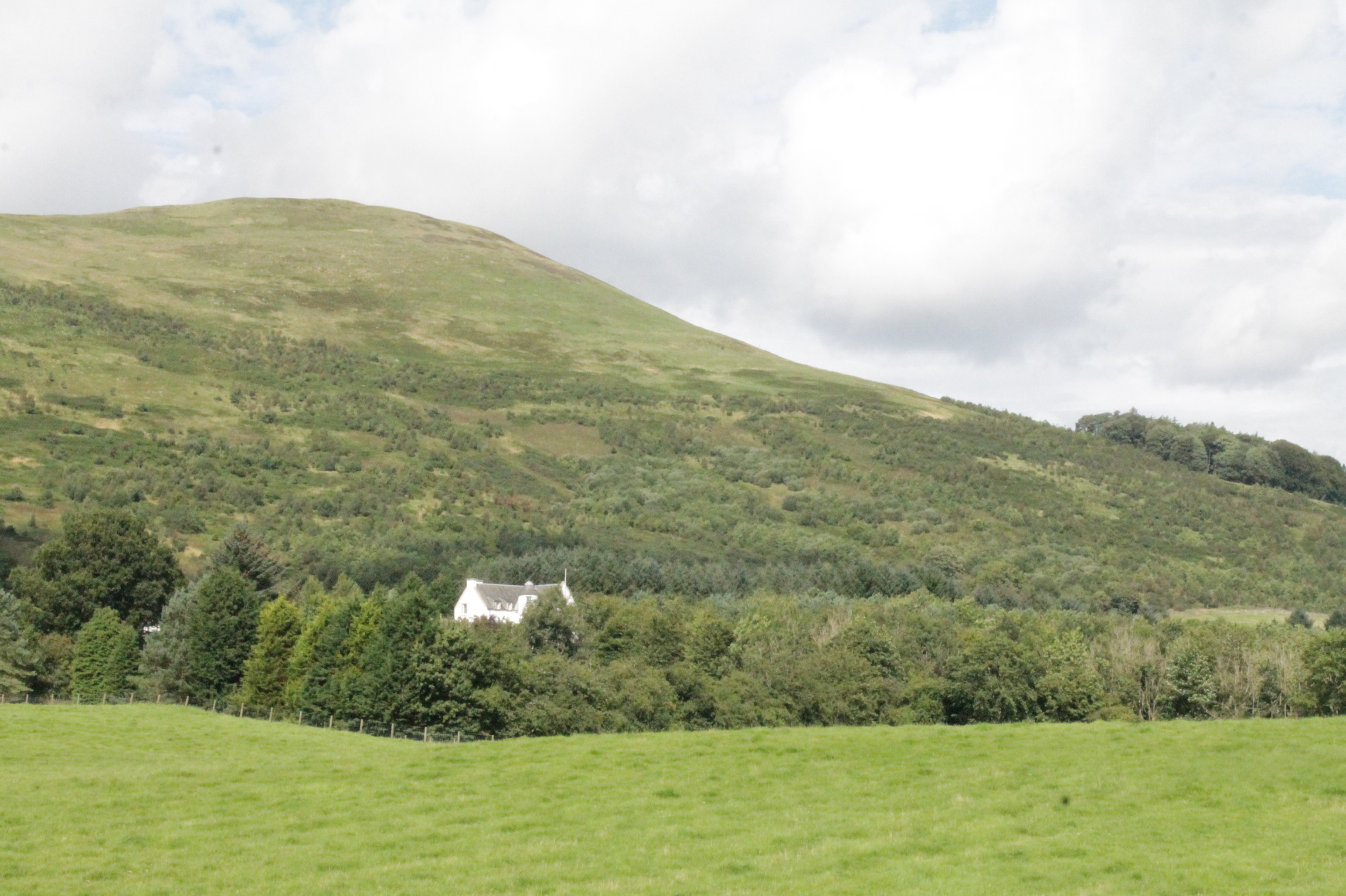
Seamab from the southwest

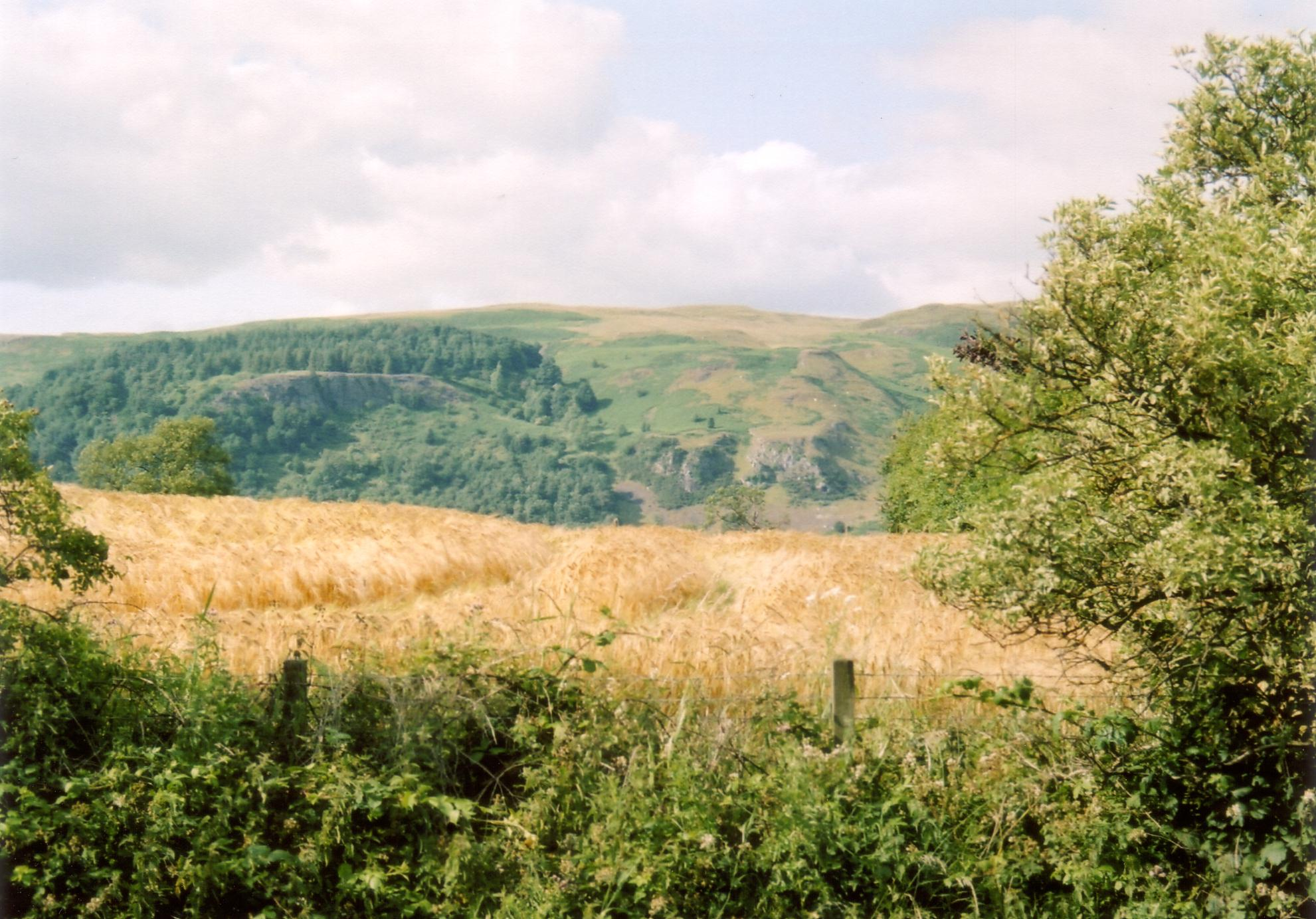
Ochil Hills viewed from Alloa road on the way to Tullibody.

In order of height.

- Ben Cleuch (Beinn Cloiche) (721 m)
- Ben Buck (679 m)
- Andrew Gannel Hill (670 m)
- Andrew Gannel Hill (south top) (669 m) (Some people mistake this for the summit.)
- King's Seat Hill (648 m)
- Tarmangie Hill (645 m)
- Whitewisp Hill (643 m)
- King's Seat Hill (south top and cairn) (643 m) (Some people mistake this for the summit.)
- Whitewisp Hill (south top) (642 m)
- Whum Hill (640 m)
- The Law (638 m)
- Blairdenon Hill (631 m)
- Ben Ever (622 m)
- Grodwell Hill (622 m)
- Blairdenon Hill (SE top) (617 m)
- Greenforet Hill (613 m)
- Innerdownie (611 m; the lowest of the 2000 ft summits in the Ochils.)
- Cairnmorris Hill (606 m)
- Skythorn Hill (601 m)
- Mickle Corum (594 m)
- Bentie Knowe (578 m)
- Scad Hill (586 m)
- Craighorn (583 m)
- Burnfoot Hill (583 m)
- Alva Moss (566 m)
- Bengengie Hill (565 m)
- Wood Hill (558 m)
- Middle Hill (556 m)
- Calf Craig (556 m) (between Wood Hill and Ben Ever)
- Middle Hill (NE top) (554 m)
- Colsnaur Hill (553 m)
- Menstrie Moss (north top) (546 m)
- Colsnaur Hill (north top (546 m)
- Menstrie Moss (south top) (545 m)
- Core Hill (543 m)
- Mid Cairn (542 m) (the highest point of Craig Leith - not named on OS Maps*)
- Sauchanwood Hill (541 m)
- Menstrie Moss (west top) (541 m)
- Unnamed top between Elistoun Hill and Andrew Gannel Hill (529 m)
- Burnfoot Hill (north top) (526 m)
- Rough Knowes (526 m)
- Saddle Hill (522 m)
- Big Hunt Hill (520 m)
- Little Corum (520 m)
- Ben Shee (516 m)
- Craig Elsie (Craig Leith's south cairn) (511 m)
- Kidlaw Hill (510 m)
- Wether Hill (503 m)
- Frandy Moss (500 m)
- Innerdouny Hill (497 m)
- Elistoun Hill (497 m)
- Craigentaggert Hill (Creag an t-Sagairt) (493 m)
- Scadlaw (488 m)
- Steele's Knowe (485 m)
- John's Hill (483 m)
- Sim's Hill (483 m)
- Glentye Hill (481 m)
- Green Law (481 m)
- Berry Hill (East) (480 m)
- Mellock Hill (479 m)
- Eastbow Hill (476 m)
- Corb Law (475 m)
- East Craig (473 m)
- Green Knowes (473 m)
- Commonedge Hill (468 m)
- Glenquey Hill (466 m)
- Carlownie Hill (465 m)
- Rowan Tree Craig (460 m)
- Ben Thrush (456 m)
- Lendrick Hill (456 m)
- Unnamed top between Big Hunt Hill and Brown Hill (453 m)
- Big Torry (452 m) (Wee Torry is marked as a peak, but widely considered to simply be the southern face of Big Torry)
- The Nebit (449 m)
- Long Craig (448 m)
- Black Creich Hill (443 m)
- Little Law (443 m)
- Hillfoot Hill (442 m)
- Seamab Hill (439 m)
- Unnamed top WSW of Colsnaur Hill (438 m)
- White Creich Hill (436 m)
- Little Hunt Hill (431 m)
- The Seat (429 m)
- Kinpauch Hill (426 m)
- Lamb Hill (422 m)
- Brown Hill (419 m)
- Dumyat (418 m)
- Loss Hill (417 m)
- Unnamed top SSW of Tambeth (414 m)
- Unnamed top between Loss Hill and Brown Hill (413 m)
- Bald Hill (412 m)
- Common Hill (412 m)
- Kames (412 m)
- Craig Rossie (410 m)
- Carmodle (408 m)
- Cock Law (408 m)
- Burnt Hill (405 m)
- The Law (404 m)
- Muckle Law Hill (400 m)
- Banks of Dollar (398 m)
- Wee Torry (circa 397 m)
- Castleton Hill (396 m)
- Tam Beth (391 m)
- Cleuch Hill (390 m)
- Hillkitty (390 m)
- Myreton Hill (387 m)
- Unnamed top SW of Colsnaur Hill (382 m)
- Castle Law (374 m)
- Knock Wood (367 m)
- Dochrie Hill (366 m)
- Down Hill (361 m)
- Black Hill (East) (357 m)
- Bank Hill (346 m)
- Cloon (346 m)
- Black Maller (336 m)
- Ashentrool (334 m)
- Unnamed top between Ashentrool and Loss Hill (333 m)
- Tillyrie Hill (332 m)
- Braughty Hill (325 m)
- Rossie Law (324 m)
- Culteuchar Hill (313 m)
- Whitehill Head (307 m)
- Arlick Hill (307 m)
- Coul Hill (306 m)
- Montalt Hill (300 m)
- Glenearn Hill (300 m)
- Norman's Law (285 m)
- Cairnie Hill (228 m)
- Black Hill (West) (226 m)
- Mount Hill (221 m)
- Lucklawhill (190 m)
- White Hill (160 m)

- Notes on "List of peaks in the Ochil Hills"

Black Hill (North-West) near Sherrifmuir is marked on OS Maps as “Black Hill", but has no distinguishable peak or summit, more of a slop leading onto Glentye Hill. Marked as 350 metres.

Peat Hill, Lamb Hill, and Gled's Nose are a selection of “hills” marked on OS Maps near NN 9768 0247. These hills have no distinguishable summit, disqualifying them as “peaks” in the Ochils, but rather they lead onto Glenquey Hill and Innerdownie respectively.

Berry Hill and The Shank (near NN 9591 0456) are marked as hills on OS maps, but fail to have distinguishable peaks. Rather, they lead onto the peak of Ben Shee.

The nn-named hill between Big Hunt Hill and Brown Hill (453 m) has three lower tops at 422m, 415m and 417m.
