= Cairngorm Lochs =

Series of lochs in upland Scotland

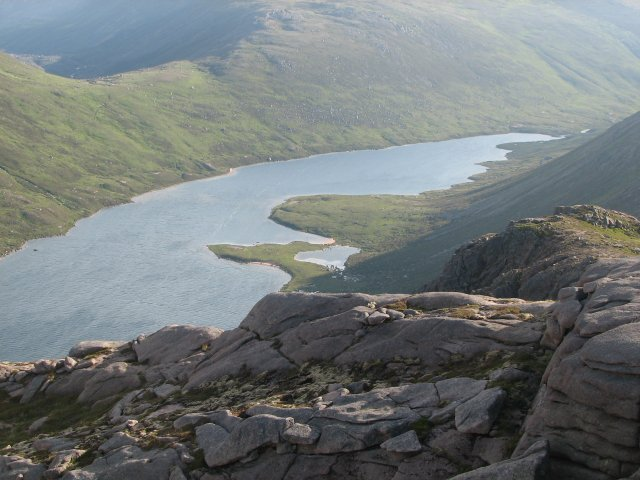
- A view towards the east end of Loch Avon
- Interactive map of Cairngorm Lochs
- Location: Grampian and Highland, Scotland
- Coordinates: 57°6′12.36″N 3°37′37.68″W
- Area: 1.73 km^{2} (0.67 sq mi)
- Established: 1981

Cairngorm Lochs is a protected wetland area in the Cairngorms, in the Grampian and Highland regions of Scotland. With a total area of 173 hectares, it covers five freshwater lochs which are among the highest areas of standing water in the UK. It has been protected as a Ramsar Site since 1981.

The site is composed of five separate lochs: Etchachan, Uiane, Coire an Lochain, Avon and Einich. All five lakes are extremely oligotrophic and support highly specialized populations of zooplankton and phytoplankton; the two largest also support plant populations including Littorella uniflora, Lobelia dortmanna and Juncus bulbosus.

As well as being recognised as a wetland of international importance under the Ramsar Convention, the lochs are additionally protected as they all lie within the boundaries of the Cairngorms National Park.
