= Barhapple Loch =

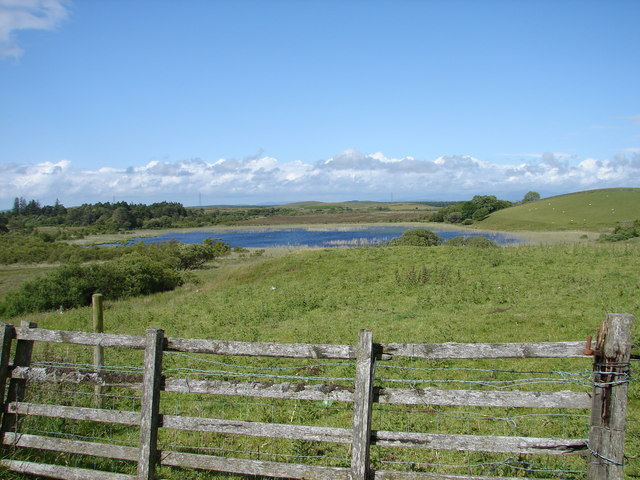
- View of Barhapple Loch from Derskelpin Farm in the southwest.

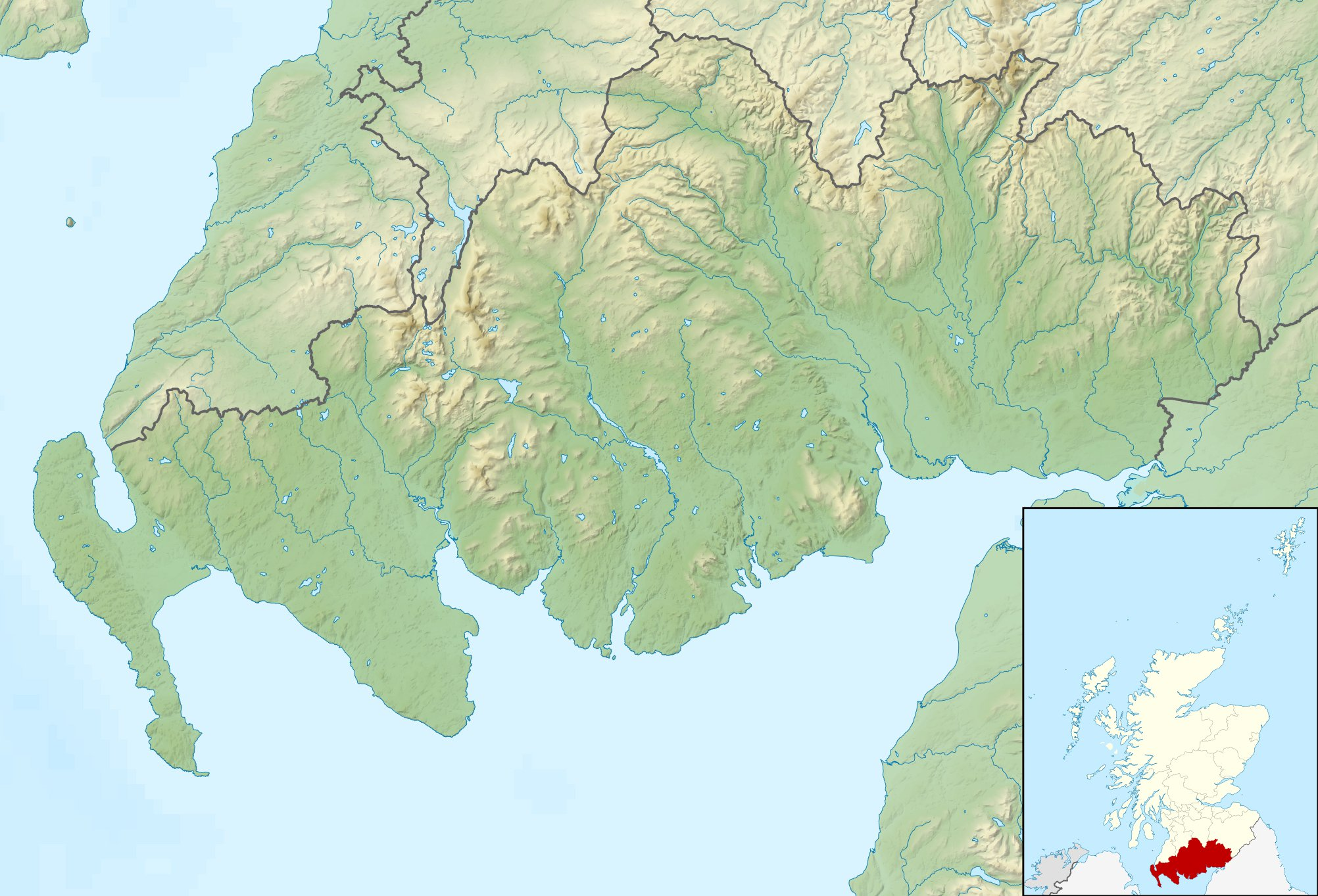
- Location within Dumfries and Galloway
- Location: Derskelpin, Glen Luce, Wigtownshire
- Coordinates: 54.8967°N 4.7150°W
- Type: freshwater loch
- River sources: Dergoals Burn
- Surface area: 9.6 ha (24 acres)
- Average depth: 2.6 ft (0.79 m)
- Max. depth: 3 ft (0.91 m)
- Shore length^{1}: 1.2 km (0.75 mi)
- Surface elevation: 88 m (289 ft)
- ^{1} Shore length is not a well-defined measure.

Barhapple Loch is a small semicircular freshwater loch located in Wigtownshire, Dumfries and Galloway in Scotland. Barhapple Loch is principally known for the discovery of a Crannog in 1878 on the loch, when it was drained.

== Settlements ==
Glenluce is the largest settlement in the area, and is located 3.9 miles from the loch in a southwesterly direction. Newton Stewart is around 10 miles to the northeast, along the A75 road.

== Geography ==
Barhapple Loch is located 4 miles (6.5 km) east of Glenluce. It is of glacial origin, of the Kettle hole type. To the south of the loch, is Derskelpin Farm. Slightly east of the farm is Dernaglar Loch. To the southwest is Dirlaughlin Hill at 114m and Knock Moss. To the east is Barhapple hill at 107m. To the east and north is Mark of Luce Moss.

== Discovery of Crannog ==
Barhapple Loch is only a few feet deep and surrounded by a deep peat bog, except on the east side, where it touched Barhapple hill, and rested on a bottom of soft peat. The black colour of the water and the inaccessible nature of the shore on the west side, precluded the discovery of any loch dwellings. In 1842, while James McCulloch was cutting peat, about 40 yards from the west side of the loch, he came upon a circle of stakes, numbering around 12. Ranging from thickness of a man's leg to a man's arm, and made of Hazel, they were about 5 feet long, with the heads two feet below the level of the ground. The circle was around 5 feet in diameter. During the autumn of 1978, the loch was drained, and in November, the tenant of the farm noticed a small round patch of logs that had become visible.

== Exploration ==
Plate III Plan of Crannog on Barhapple Loch

On 15 October 1880, a party was formed and led by the John Dalrymple, Earl of Stair to explore the crannog. Among the party of eight was Sir John Dalrymple-Hay, 3rd Baronet. The digging was stopped at a depth of between two and three feet by the appearance of water, but which point several discoveries were made. It was reported, that the loch-dwelling consisted of mainly oak piles and a platform of wood, with rough stone added at some point. The discovery was located some 280 feet from the shore, so a gangway was built from the east shore from the foot of Barhapple, where it is hard ground, at a length of 550 feet to facilitate viewing by the surveyors.

The discovery consisted of a row of oak piles, enclosing a space of 175 feet long from north to south and 127 feet wide, with rounded angles. Sir Herbert Maxwell took the first measurements of what remained of the crannog. 134 piles were visible, with a slight gap on the west side and larger one on the south side, with the piles on each side thingly set. It is surrounded by a row of oak piles, enclosing a space 175 feet long from north to south, and 127 feet broad, and rounded at the angles. The crannog appeared to be connected to the N and E shores of the loch by gangways on piles. A ring of Cannel coal of around 5.68 cm was discovered during the excavations. In 1884 a further excavation was undertaken. Some of the logs had rotted away, and others were pierced through by the shoots of the marsh plants, which gradually covered the partially drained area.

The crannog were surveyed in July 2002 for only the second time, both above and below water level, during the 2nd phase of the South-West Scotland Crannog Survey, with the intention of establishing an effective system of monitoring the rate of organic decay. Many of the timbers had a spongy consistency and with the shallow depth of the loch and changing levels, meant they are unlikely to survive, with ongoing monitoring of the site being recommended. It was estimated that 3000 trees had been used to build the structure. An analysis of the frequent occurrences of the syllables der, dir and dar in the places near Barhapple was undertaken that indicated that they area was once heavily wooded by trees, long ago. A topographic rhyme, passed down the centuries and told to the narrator Robert Munro by the farmer Thomas McCormick of Mindork, in Kirkowan, 1 mile to the east of Barhapple Loch, states:

Knocketie and Knockietore, Laniegoose and Laniegore, Dirnefuel and Dirniefranie, wee Barsolas and Derrnagie

Further surveys were conducted in 2003 and 2004 as part of the South-West Scotland Crannog Survey. There has been 4 other lochs in Old Luce parish with crannogs.

== Fauna ==
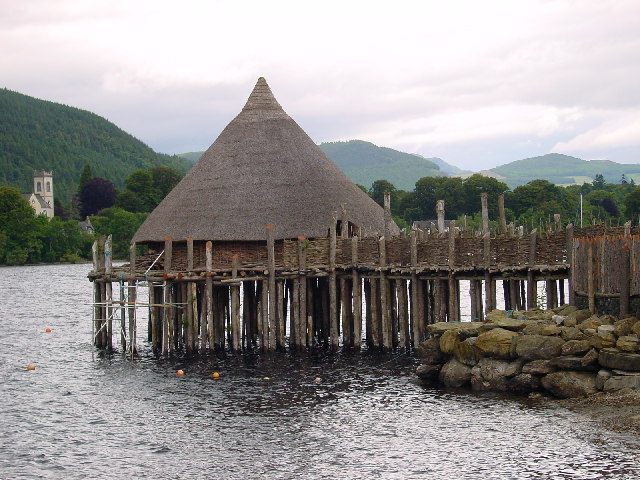
Reconstructed crannog near Kenmore, Perth and Kinross, on Loch Tay, Scotland

The north side of the loch is covered by a dense association of Phragmites Communis. On the west side, there is a considerable coverage of marsh, dominated by Carex rostrata and C filiformis. On the east shore it is gravelly and peaty. On the south side plants including Juncus bufonius, Juncus supinus and Peplis portula. There are few mosses or hepatics on the shores.
