= David Cairns =

David Cairns may refer to:

- Sir David Arnold Scott Cairns (1902–1987), Lord Justice of Appeal
- David Cairns (politician) (1966–2011), British politician
- David Cairns (rugby league) (born 1959), rugby league footballer
- David Cairns (writer) (born 1926), music critic and writer
- David Cairns, 5th Earl Cairns (1909–1989), Marshal of the Diplomatic Corps in the Royal Household
- David Cairns (musician) (born 1958), songwriter
- Davie Cairns (born 1951), Scottish footballer

== See also ==
- Cairns (disambiguation)
