= Tarmangie Hill =

Hill in Scotland

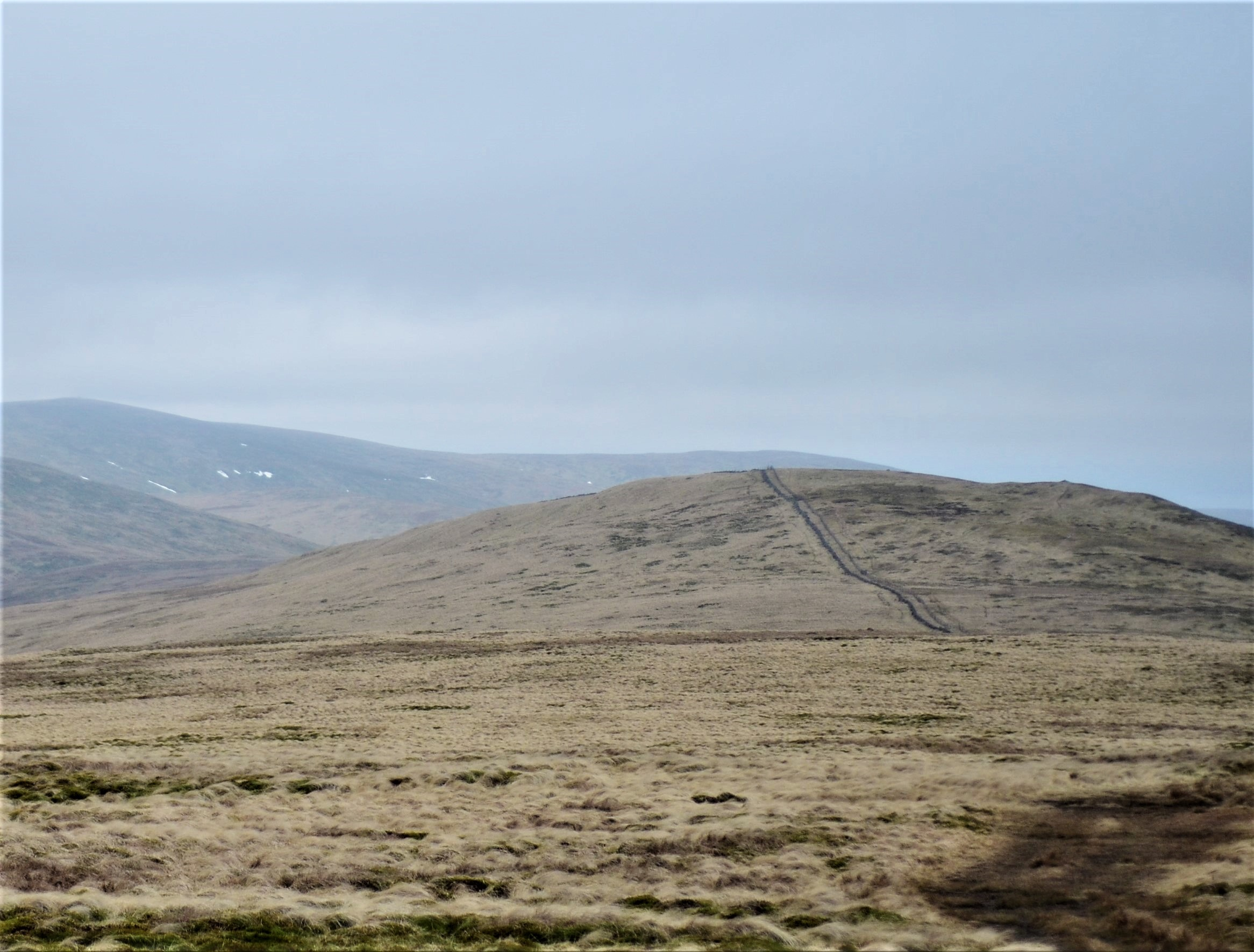

Highest point
- Elevation: 645 m (2,116 ft)
- Prominence: 78 m (256 ft)
- Listing: Tu,Sim,D,GT,DN

Geography
- Location: Clackmannanshire, Scotland
- Parent range: Ochil Hills
- OS grid: NN 94218 01397

Tarmangie Hill is a hill in the Ochil Hills range, part of the Central Lowlands in Scotland. It is one of two Ochil Donalds to lie on the Clackmannanshire-Perth and Kinross border - the other being Blairdenon Hill. It is often climbed as part of a round from Glen Sherup.

== Subsidiary SMC Summits ==
| Summit | Height (m) | Listing |
|---|---|---|
| Whitewisp Hill | 643 | Tu,Sim,DT,GT,DN |
