= Norman's Law =

Coordinates: 56.3690°N 3.1267°W

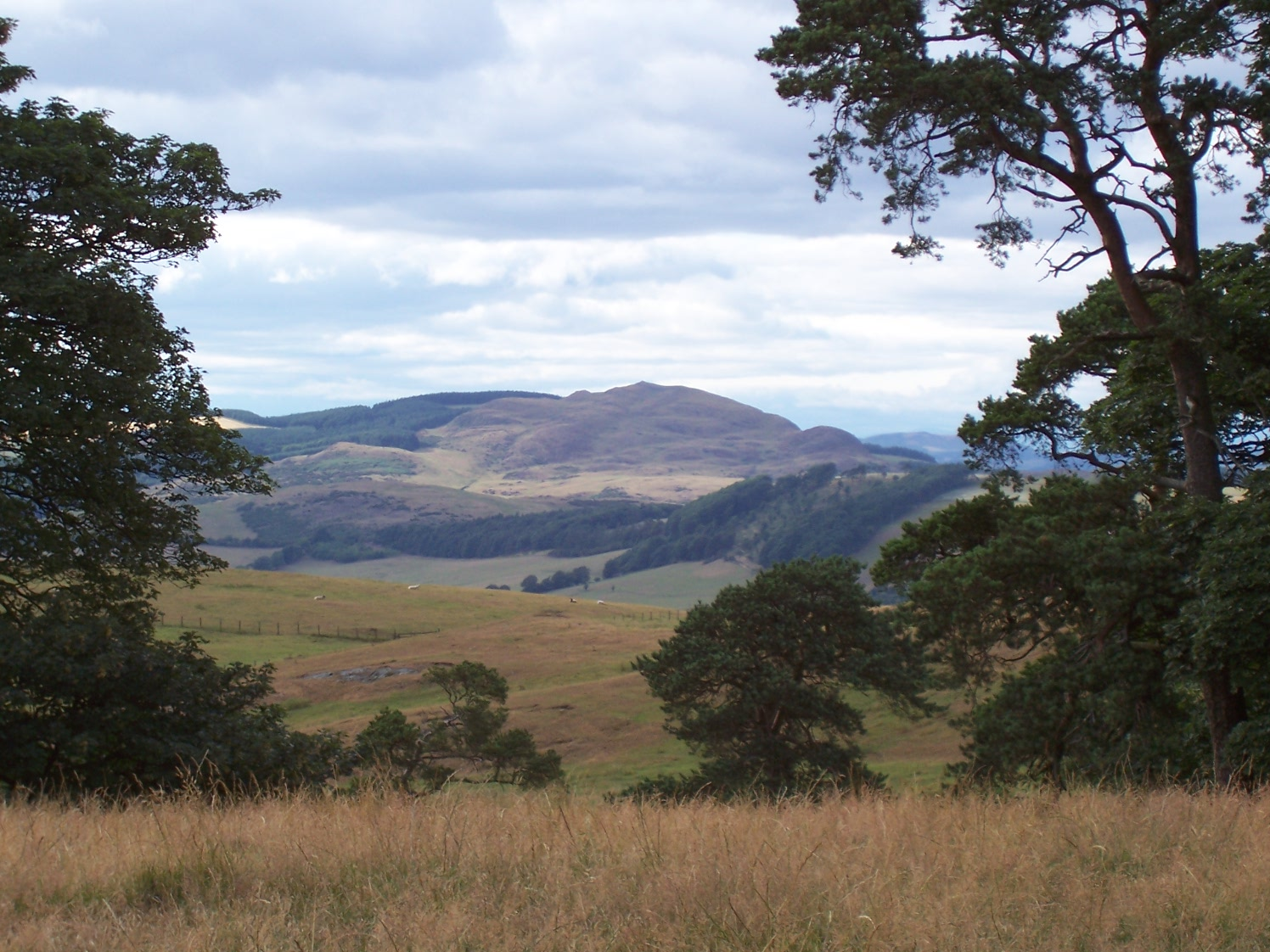

Highest point
- Elevation: 285 m (935 ft)
- Prominence: 209 m (686 ft)
- Parent peak: Innerdouny Hill
- Listing: Marilyn

Geography
- Location within Scotland
- Location: Fife, Scotland
- Parent range: Ochil Hills
- OS grid: NO305202
- Topo map: OS Landranger 59

Norman's Law is a prominent hill at the far eastern end of the Ochil Fault, Scotland. It sits above the south bank of the River Tay, around four miles north west of Cupar.

Around the summit cairn of Norman's Law are the remains of an Iron Age hill fort and settlement, owing to the hill's commanding views over the surrounding countryside and the defensive advantage provided by the steep slopes surrounding the summit. The hill fort is a designated scheduled monument.

The summit of Norman's Law is easily accessible; the shortest ascent is from NO310209, about a mile west of the village of Brunton; a waymarked path to the summit starts in the village of Luthrie NO331196. There are extensive views of Central Scotland and the Grampian Mountains. On a clear day, one can see as far as Lochnagar to the north, Ben More (Crianlarich) to the west and the Moorfoot Hills to the south.

The Norman's Law hill race is held annually by Fife AC and begins at the nearby village of Luthrie.
