= King's Seat Hill =

Hill in Clackmannanshire, Scotland

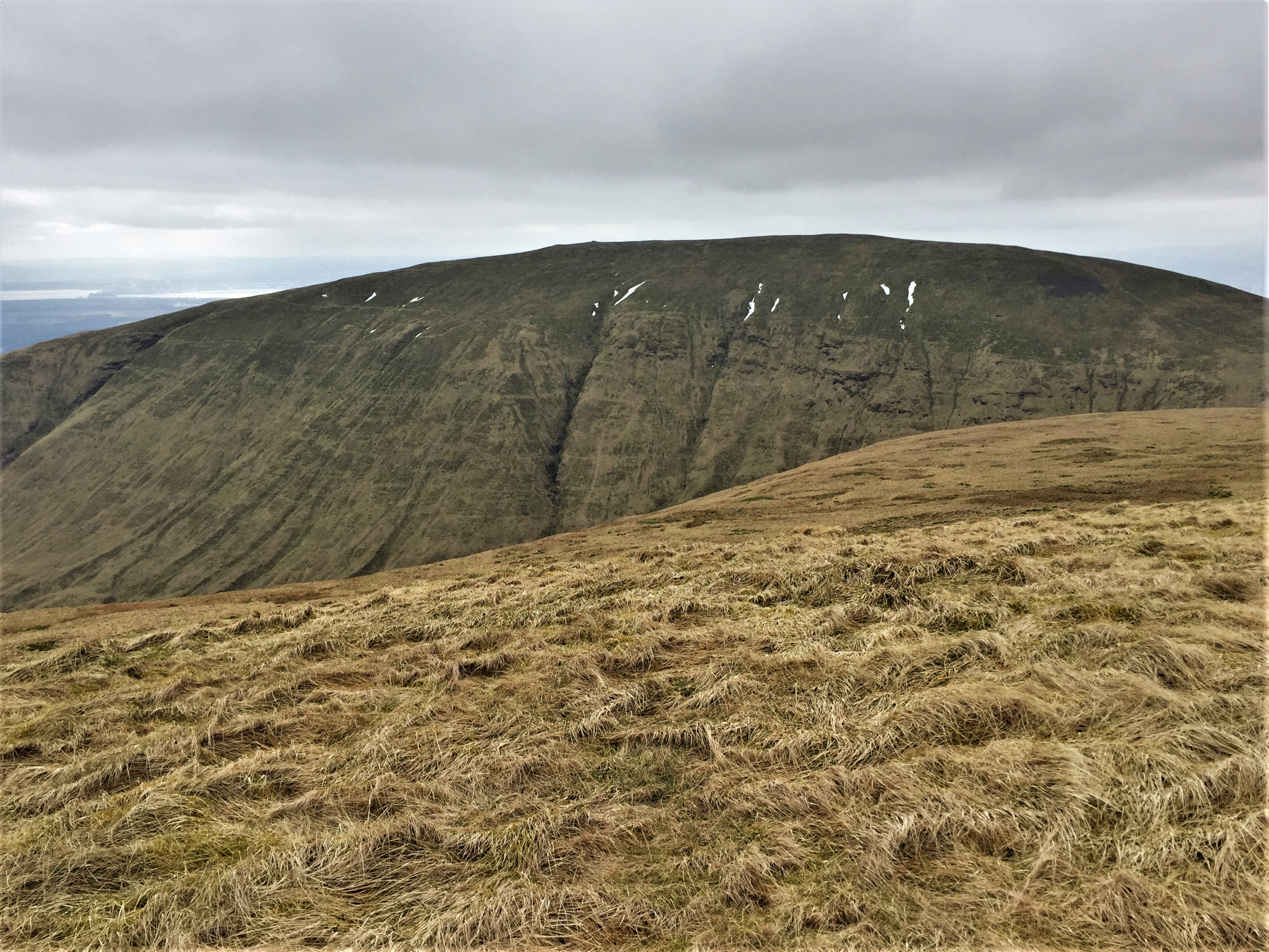

Highest point
- Elevation: 648 m (2,126 ft)
- Prominence: 135 m (443 ft)
- Listing: Hu,Tu,Sim,D,GT,DN,Y

Geography
- Location: Clackmannanshire, Scotland
- Parent range: Ochil Hills
- OS grid: NS 93387 99986

King's Seat Hill is a hill in the Ochil Hills range, part of the Central Lowlands in Scotland. A popular hill, paths originate from the foothill towns of Tillicoultry and Dollar to the southwest and southeast respectively, but the hill is also climbed as part of a cross-range walk. The location of the exact summit is difficult to find due to the flatness of the summit area, however a large tourist cairn is found to the south.
