= Loch Einich =

Small inland lake in Scotland

- Loch Eanaich
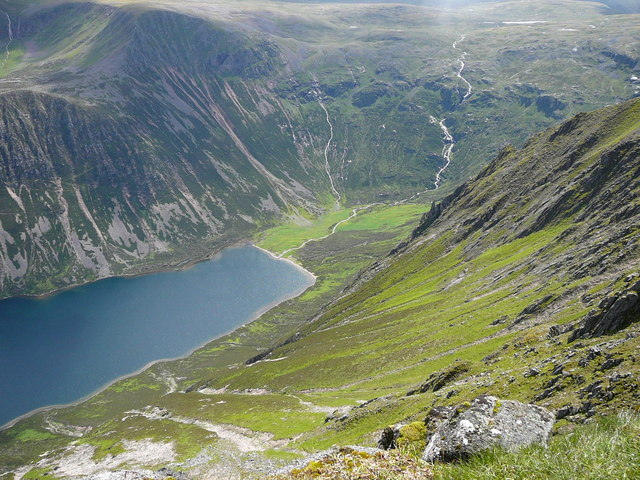
- Coire Odhar at the head of Loch Einich from Sgor Gaoith

- Location within Highland
- Location: Cairngorm mountains, Scotland
- Coordinates: 57°4′9″N 3°47′25″W
- Type: high-altitude oligotrophic lake
- Primary outflows: Am Beanaidh
- Catchment area: 11.94 km^{2} (4.61 sq mi)
- Max. length: 2 km (1.2 mi)
- Max. width: 0.5 km (0.31 mi)
- Surface area: 74 ha (180 acres)
- Average depth: 6.8 m (22 ft)
- Max. depth: 45 m (148 ft)
- Water volume: 5,032,265 m^{3} (177,712,800 ft^{3})
- Shore length^{1}: 4 km (2.5 mi)
- Surface elevation: 498 m (1,634 ft)
- ^{1} Shore length is not a well-defined measure.

Loch Einich or Loch Eanaich (Loch of the Boggy Area) is a remote freshwater loch in Gleann Einich, in the Cairngorms National Park of Highland Scotland. It is some 2.5 kilometres (1.6 mi) to the west of Braeriach and its outflow is the Am Beanaidh burn, flowing north through the glen towards Coylumbridge. The loch is hemmed in by the high plateau of the Moine Mhor on the east, the ridge of Sgòr Gaoith to the west, and Coire Odhar at its head.

== Geography ==
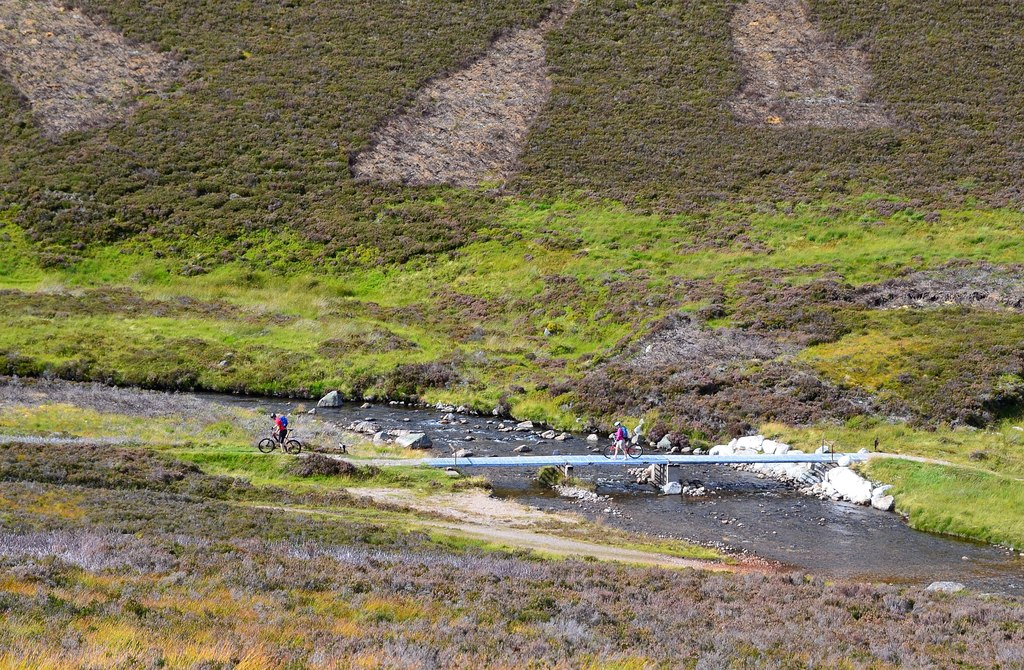
Footbridge over Am Beanaidh (Note: Another, better known, footbridge, the Cairngorm Club footbridge goes across the Am Beanaidh lower down to provide a route from Coylumbridge to Loch Morlich. The bridge in the photograph is used by the path going up to Loch Einich.)

Adam Watson considers Gleann Einich to be one of the grandest Cairngorm glens with pine trees at lower levels, then open moorland, and lastly with the loch held between crags. The Am Beanaidh burn flows down from the loch. Loch Einich is one of the five Cairngorm Lochs, a protected Ramsar Site. Its surface is occasionally covered with ice and the shore consists of glacial drift, boulders and storm beaches. It is situated in a glacial trough at 496 metres (1,627 ft) at the head of the glen. The water supply for Strathspey comes from the loch. From just before the foot of the loch a stalkers' path heads up Coire Dhondail which leads onto the Moine Mhor plateau near the Wells of Dee and the summit of Braeriach. Although Sgor Gaoith and Sgoran Dubh Mor are normally climbed from Glen Feshie, there is also a route from Loch Einich. Along the western shore of the loch is Ross's path which then climbs up to a' Phocaid from where the ridge can be attained.

== Wildlife ==
The biota of this high-altitude oligotrophic loch is arctic–alpine and it supports specialised populations of plankton. Flora include Littorella uniflora, Lobelia dortmanna, Juncus bulbosus and Isoetes. Brown trout and Arctic charr are to be found in the loch.

Dippers flip along rocks in the loch, greenshank often feed along its northern shores and common sandpipers nest on its stony banks. Snipe, mallard, red grouse, teal and meadow pipit nest in the heathery bogland around the loch. Whooper swans and greylag geese can be found swimming in the water.
