= Cairncross (surname) =

Cairncross is a surname of Scottish origin, mostly found and is believed to originate in the east of Scotland. It is derived from locality Cairncross, Angus and typically found in Angus, East Lothian, Fife, Perthshire, and in the Borders.

Notable people with the surname include:

- Alexander Cairncross (disambiguation), multiple people
- Cam Cairncross (born 1972), Australian baseball player
- Frances Cairncross (born 1944), British economist, journalist and academic
- John Cairncross (1913–1995), Soviet spy from Glasgow
- Robert Cairncross (died 1544), Scottish bishop of Edinburgh in the 16th century
- Sandy Cairncross (born 1948), expert on tropical environmental health
