= Cairncross =

Cairncross may refer to:

== Places ==
=== Australia ===
- Mary Cairncross Reserve, Queensland
- Cairncross Dockyard, Brisbane, Queensland
- Cairncross Island

=== Scotland ===
- Cairncross, Angus - Angus 56.90N 02.83W NO4979

== Other uses ==
- Cairncross (surname), including a list of people with the name
