= McCairns =

McCairns is a surname. Notable people with the surname include:

- Jim McCairns (1919–1948), English pilot
- Tommy McCairns (1873–1932), English footballer

== See also ==
- Cairns (disambiguation)#People
