= Càrn Glas-choire =

Mountain in Highland, Scotland

Coordinates: 57.339445°N 3.843279°W

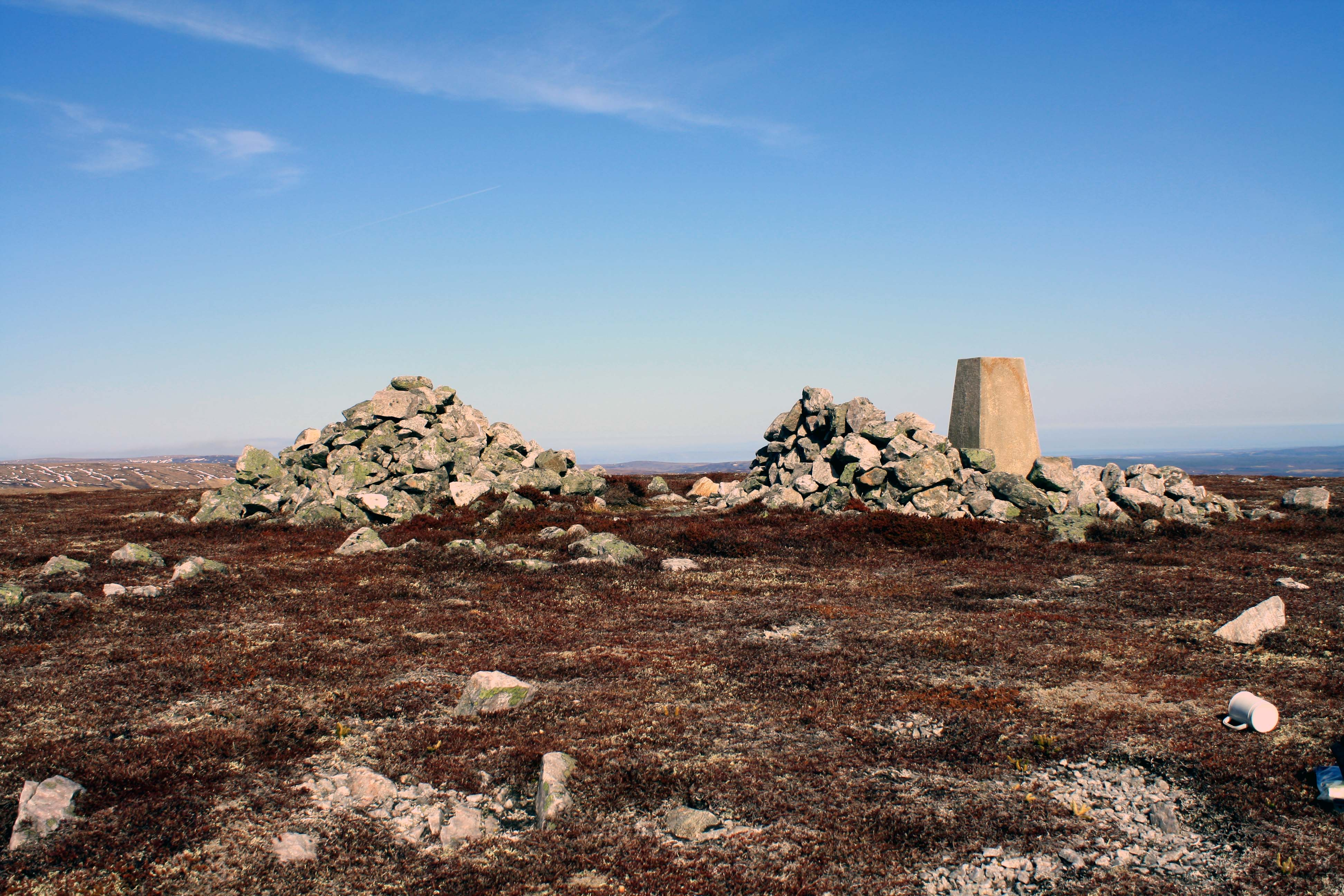
Summit of Càrn Glas-choire

Càrn Glas-choire is a mountain in Highland, Scotland, on the north-western boundary of the Cairngorms National Park.

It has an elevation of 654.9 m (2,149 ft) and a prominence of 251 m (823 ft) and is classed as a Graham and a Marilyn.

It is the highest point of the County of Nairn, and lies north of Carrbridge.
