= Clan Cairns =

Scottish clan

Arms of Cairns of that Ilk.

Clan Cairns is a Scottish clan. The clan does not have a chief recognised by the Lord Lyon King of Arms, therefore the clan has no standing under Scots Law. Clan Cairns is considered an armigerous clan, meaning that it is considered to have had at one time a chief who possessed the chiefly arms, however no one at present is in possession of such arms. The arms of Cairns of that Ilk are blazoned as: Gules, three merlette Or.

The surname Cairns is derived from the Scottish Gaelic carn, meaning "cairn". It is a topographic name for someone who lived near a cairn. The lands of Cairns are located in Midlothian and West Lothian.

William de Carnys was a witness to an inspection of a Charter in 1350, this is one of the earliest known records of the name. In 1363, William de Carnys and his son Duncan held the baronies of Easter and Wester Whitburn. Many Cairns are also recorded in the counties of Midlothian and West Lothian. Today many Cairns are still located around Edinburgh and Glasgow. A thorough history of the family was produced in 1906 by Henry Cairnes Lawlor, A History of the Family of Cairnes or Cairns and Its Connections. In it Lawlor chronicles nearly 600 years of the family's history, from the first historical appearance William de Carnys, through the time when the book was written.

== See also ==
- Cairns (disambiguation)
