= Cairns Castle =

Ruined keep in West Lothian, Scotland

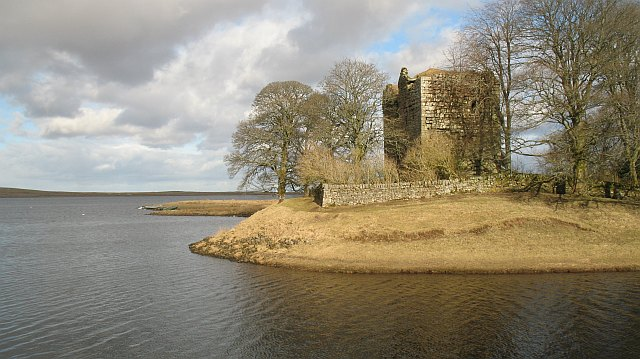
- Cairns Castle beside Harperrig Reservoir

Location
- Location within West Lothian
- Coordinates: 55.8292°N 3.4537°W

Site history
- Built: 15th century

Cairns Castle is a ruined keep, dating from the 15th century. It is located on the northern slope of the Pentland Hills, around 6.5 miles (10.5 km) south west of Balerno, at the south west end of Harperrig Reservoir, in West Lothian, Scotland.

It may have also been known as Easter Cairns Castle, but this may refer to another castle in the area.

== History ==
The Crichtons inherited the castle through the marriage of the castle's heiress, who was the granddaughter of William de Carnys, the original owner.

== Structure ==
The castle has an adjoining wing. It has a vaulted basement, a kitchen on the ground floor, and a hall above. All floors were reached by a turnpike stair in the corner between the main block and the wing. There were at least three storeys. The kitchen fireplace was converted into an entrance. The entrance tower to the east no longer exists.

It has been a Scheduled Monument since 30 November 1981. It was a category B listed building until it was de-listed in 2015.
