= Warwick Cairns =

British author

- Born: 1962 (age 63–64); Dagenham, Essex
- Education: Keele University; Yale University
- Children: Two daughters
- Writing career
- Language: English
- Genre: Non-fiction
- Website: warwickcairns.com

Warwick Cairns (born 1962) is a British author. His three books include: How to Live Dangerously, About the Size of It, and In Praise of Savagery.

== Early life and education ==
Cairns was born in Dagenham, Essex, England. He was educated in English and psychology at Keele University in England and English at Yale University in the United States, where he studied under Professor Harold Bloom.

His first book, About the Size of It (Pan Macmillan, 2007) championed the cause of traditional systems of measurement. His second, How to Live Dangerously (Pan Macmillan, 2008 and St. Martin's Press, 2009) criticised the excessive concern with 'Health & Safety' throughout much of the industrialised world and argued that it is necessary to embrace risk to live life to the full. His third book, In Praise of Savagery, tells the story of a 1930s expedition by the British explorer Wilfred Thesiger, and a journey to meet him in a mud hut in Africa towards the end of his life.
