= Alexander Cairncross =

Alexander Cairncross may refer to:

- Alexander Cairncross (bishop) (1637–1701), Archbishop of Glasgow
- Alexander Cairncross (economist) (1911–1998), Scottish academic
- Sandy Cairncross (Alexander Messent Cairncross, born 1948), Scottish epidemiologist
