= Innerdouny Hill =

- Innerdouny Hill

Highest point
- Elevation: 497 m (1,631 ft)
- Prominence: 228 m (748 ft)
- Listing: Marilyn
- Coordinates: 56°14′55″N 3°33′48″W

Geography
- Location: Perth and Kinross, Scotland
- Parent range: Ochil Hills
- OS grid: NO032073
- Topo map: OS Landranger 58

Innerdouny Hill (497 m) is a hill in the Ochil Hills of Perth and Kinross, Scotland. It is located northwest of the town of Kinross. The second highest Marilyn of the Ochils after Ben Cleuch, its slopes are heavily forested but the summit area is clear
