= Fred Cairns =

British comedian and music hall artist

- Born: 1857; Scotland
- Died: 1 April 1896 (aged 39); South Africa - Johannesburg
- Occupations: Comedian, Music hall artist

Fred Cairns (1857 Scotland – 1 April 1896, Johannesburg, South Africa) was a well-known British comedian and music hall artist of the Victorian age. He was attached to the Lupino troupe for several years, operating out of the Britannia Theatre, Hoxton, and toured the music halls of the country.

He died on 1 April 1896 in Johannesburg during a tour of South Africa by the company of Messrs Hyman and Alexander, playing both the Empire Palace of Varieties and Theatre Royal of Varieties. (The Era roundly criticised this situation for not having two companies.)

== Songs ==
- "Blot Upon The Family Name"
- "A Funny Cuts"

== Some sample billings ==
1881-04-03	Liverpool
1885-09-05	Fred Cairns, Comedian at The Royal (Theatre) (advert in The Era)
1886-04-24	Fred Cairns the Albert Palace, Battersea Park (advert in the News of the World)
1886-05-01	F Cairns, vocal comic and Step dancer at South London Palace (advert in the News of the World)
1886-12-25	Fred Cairns at the Alhambra Theatre of Varieties (advert in the News of the World)
1887-01-01; 1887-01-08; 1887-01-22	Fred Cairns at The Oxford Theatre (along with Amy Height) (advert in The Era)
1887-01-29; 1887-02-19	Fred Cairns at The Canterbury Theatre, Edgware Road (along with Amy Height) (advert in The Era)
1887-02-16	Fred Cairns at The Collins Theatre, Islington Green (along with Amy Height) (advert in The Era)
1890-09-06	Fred Cairns, variety artiste at The Middlesex (Theatre) (advert in The Era)
