= Loch Coire an Lochain =

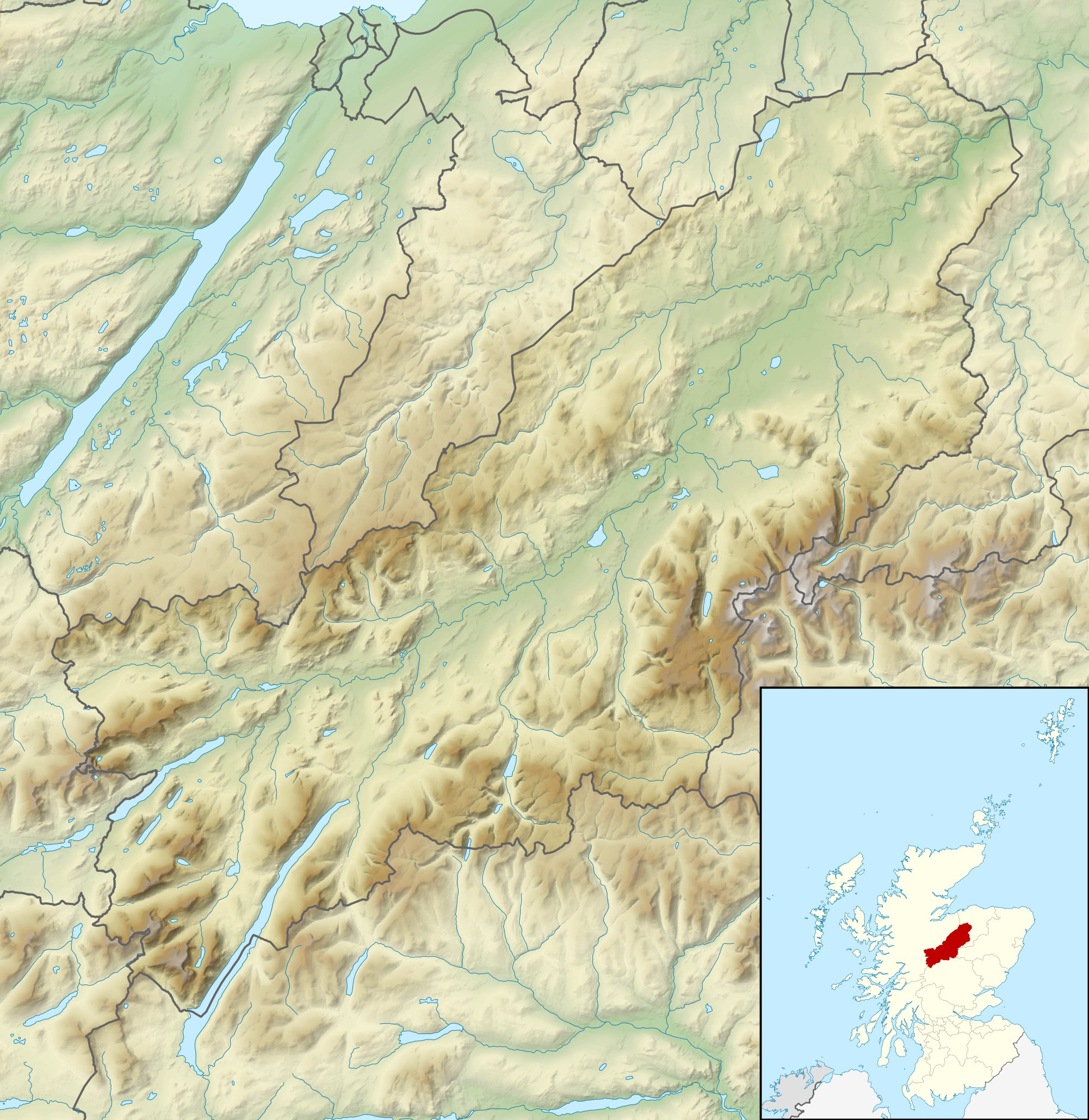
- Location within Badenoch and Strathspey
- Location: Cairngorms, Grampian Mountains, Scotland
- Coordinates: 57°4′57.8″N 3°44′44.2″W
- Primary outflows: None
- Basin countries: Scotland
- Max. length: 0.51 km (0.32 mi)
- Surface area: 0.094 km^{2} (0.036 sq mi)
- Max. depth: 6.1 m (20 ft)
- Surface elevation: 997 m (3,271 ft)

Loch Coire an Lochain is a small freshwater loch located below the summit of Braeriach in the eastern Highlands of Scotland. At 997 m (3,271 ft) above sea level, it is among the highest named bodies of water in the British Isles

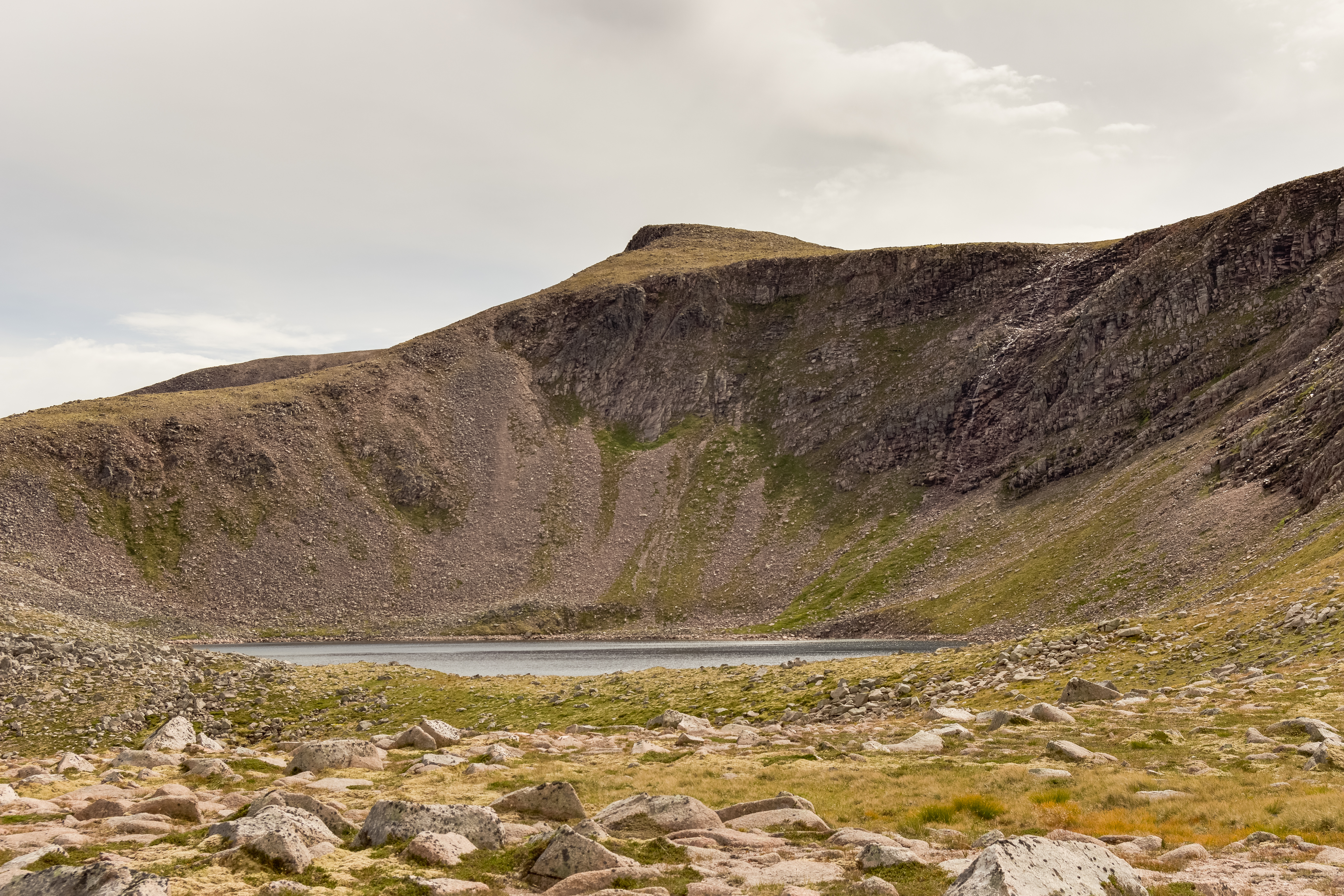
Looking approximately southeast across Loch Coire an Lochain towards the summit of Braeriach

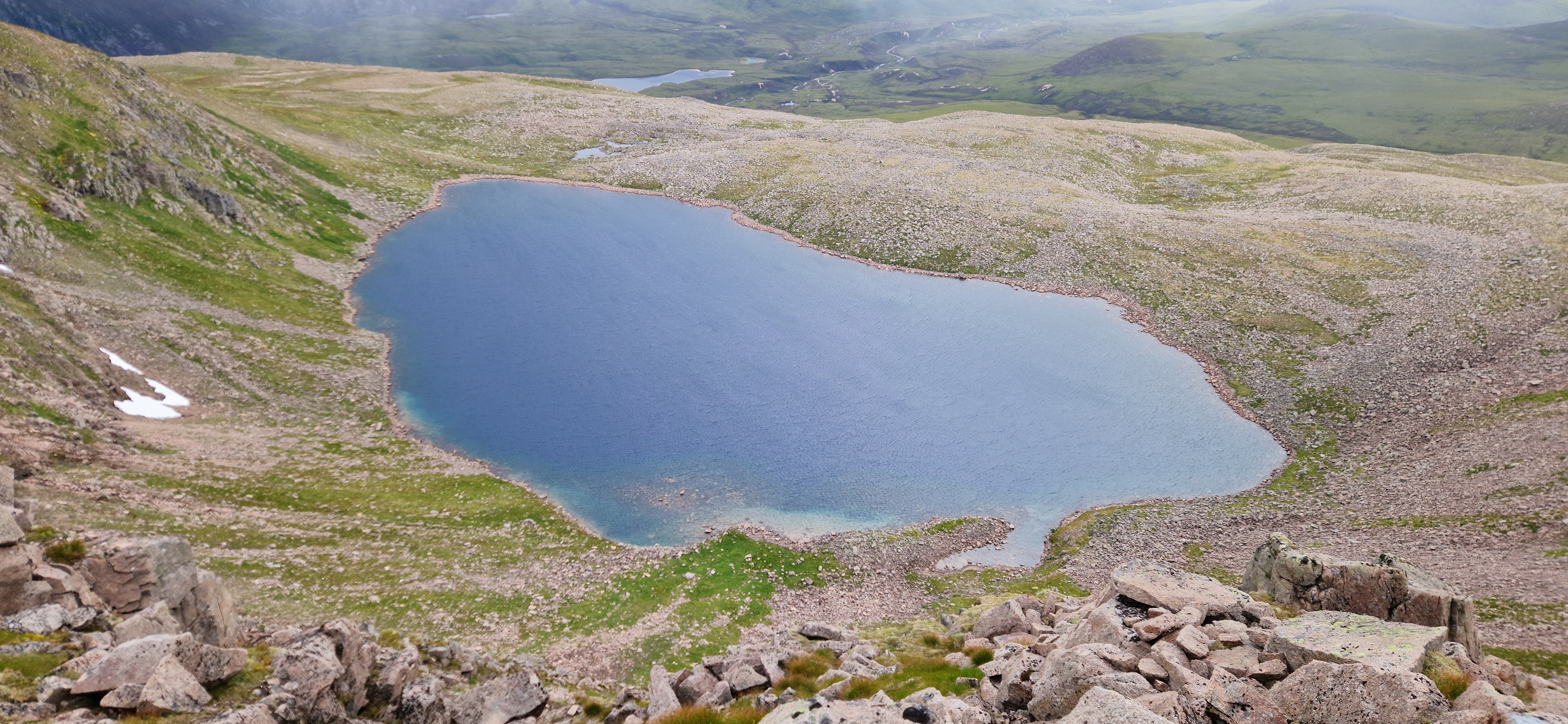
Top-down view of Loch Coire an Lochain
