= HMAS Cairns =

One ship and one shore establishment of Royal Australian Navy (RAN) have been named HMAS Cairns, for the city of Cairns, Queensland.

- HMAS Cairns (J183), a Bathurst-class corvette launched in 1941 and transferred to the Royal Netherlands Navy in 1946
- HMAS Cairns (naval base), the RAN's minor war vessel base located in the city of the same name, which was opened in 1974

== Battle honours ==
Four battle honours have been awarded to HMAS Cairns:

- Pacific 1942–45
- Indian Ocean 1942–45
- Sicily 1943
- Okinawa 1945
