= Blairdenon Hill =

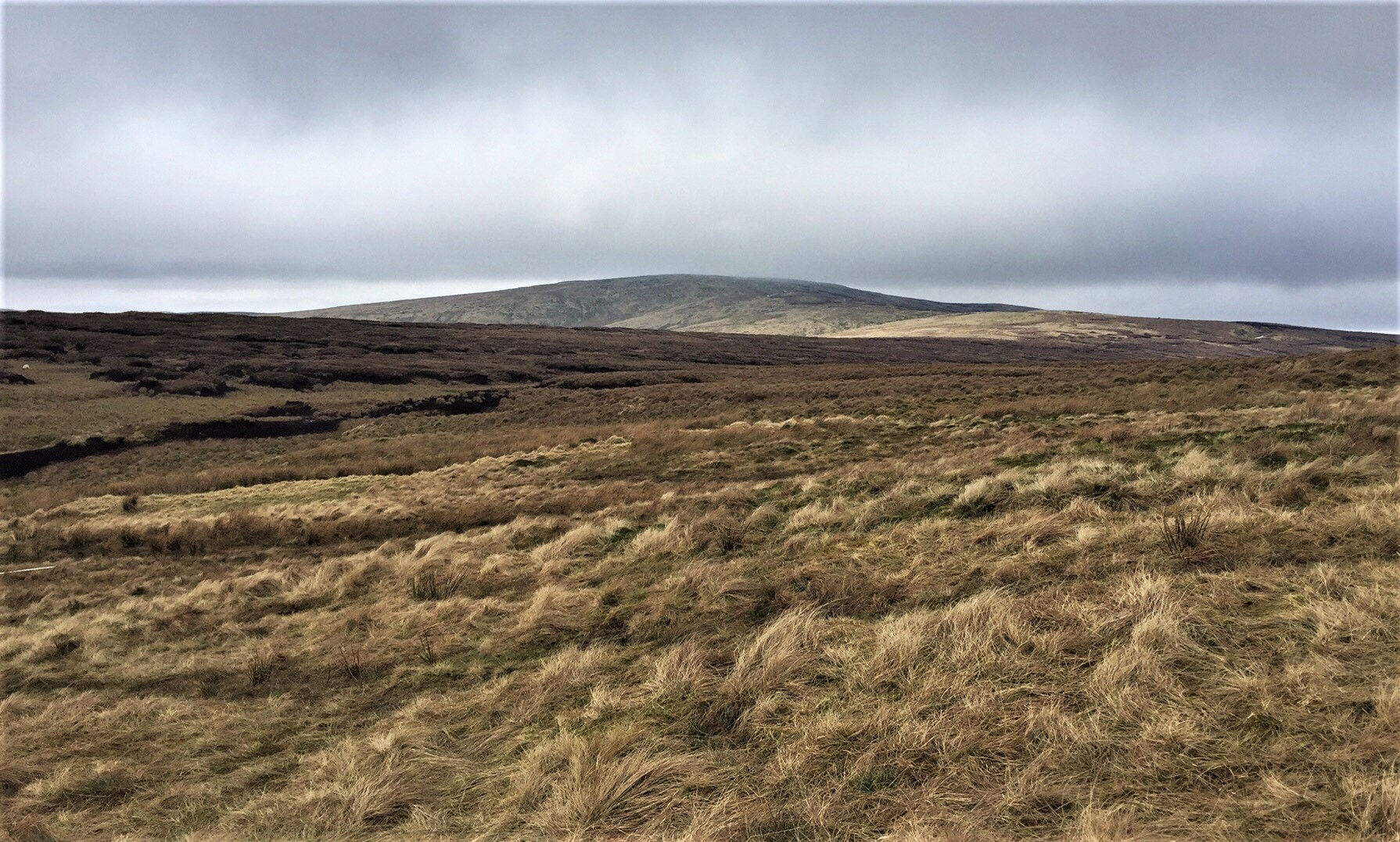

Highest point
- Elevation: 631 m (2,070 ft)
- Prominence: 94 m (308 ft)
- Listing: Tu,Sim,D,sHu,GT,DN,Y

Naming
- English translation: Scottish Gaelic, English: Hill of the Field of the River Devon

Geography
- Location: Clackmannanshire, Scotland
- Parent range: Ochil Hills
- OS grid: NN 86557 01867

Blairdenon Hill is a hill in the Ochil Hills range, part of the Central Lowlands of Scotland. It is the highest point on the western portion of the range. Approximately 220m west of the summit lies the site of a plane wreckage of a De Havilland DH 82 Tiger Moth which crashed on 30 August 1957 and killed the pilot, A. J. Cuthbertson - a small, white cross stand at the site in memoriam.
