= Cairn Hill =

A number of mountains in the British Isles have the name Cairn Hill

- Cairn Hill (Antarctica)
- Cairn Hill, Northumberland, one of the Cheviot Hills, England
- Carn Clonhugh in County Longford, Ireland which is also known as Cairn/Corn Hill
  - Cairn Hill transmission site radio and television transmission
- Cairn Hill, Scotland, Scotland, see Cairnryan#History

== Other uses ==
- Cairn Hill mine, an iron ore mine in Australia
