= Silver Glen =

Coordinates: 56.1583°N 3.7852°W

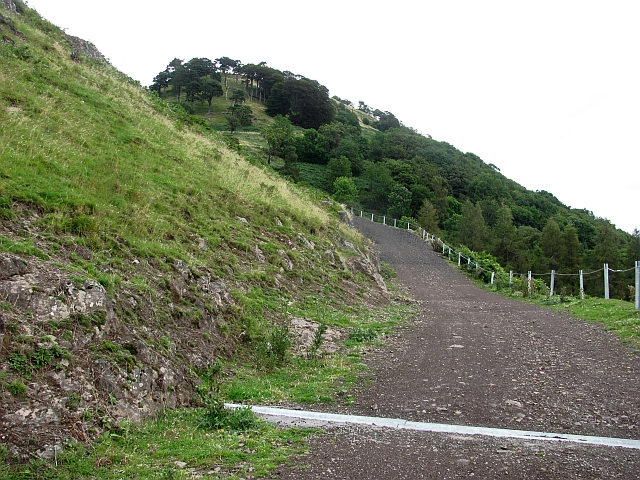
Silver Glen road

The Silver Glen lies approximately 1 kilometre (0.62 mi) to the east of the town of Alva, Clackmannanshire, Scotland, and takes its name from the silver that was mined there in the early 18th century. The deposit, the richest deposit of native silver ever found in the British Isles, was discovered just as the Jacobite rising of 1715 was breaking out, and its owner, Sir John Erskine, left to join the rebels, leaving his wife in charge of the mine. Some 40 tons of ore were raised and buried in barrels in the grounds of Alva House at the foot of the Ochil Hills, about 10 kilometres (6.2 mi) east of Stirling, whilst the richest of the ore was smelted and the ingots concealed under floorboards inside the house. The mine was then filled in during the aftermath of the failed rising, but its existence was revealed to the government by an employee of the Erskines. Samples of the ore were analysed by Sir Isaac Newton and found to be very rich. Sir John was later able to secure a pardon for his role in the rising, on condition he revealed all he knew about the mine, and gave a tenth of the proceeds to the government. Mining resumed a few years later and the remainder of the deposit was extracted. Later, in 1759, a vein carrying erythrite, an ore of cobalt, was found and gave a new lease of life to the mines, but it was soon exhausted.

Many of the old mineworkings can still be seen, but the new landowners, The Woodland Trust, have installed locked gates on the more extensive workings, as there are unprotected shafts within.

There is not much trace of silver to be found now, as the dumps have been well worked over by mineral collectors. Some fine examples of crystallized dendritic silver were found in the 1980s.

There are other mine workings at Carnaughton Glen, on the west side of Alva just above the golf course, which are often confused with the Silver Glen. These are barren trials from the 1770s. Again, there is at least one shaft, this time water-filled, so casual exploration by the inexperienced is not advised.
