= Cairnie Hill =

Coordinates: 56.3264°N 3.1675°W

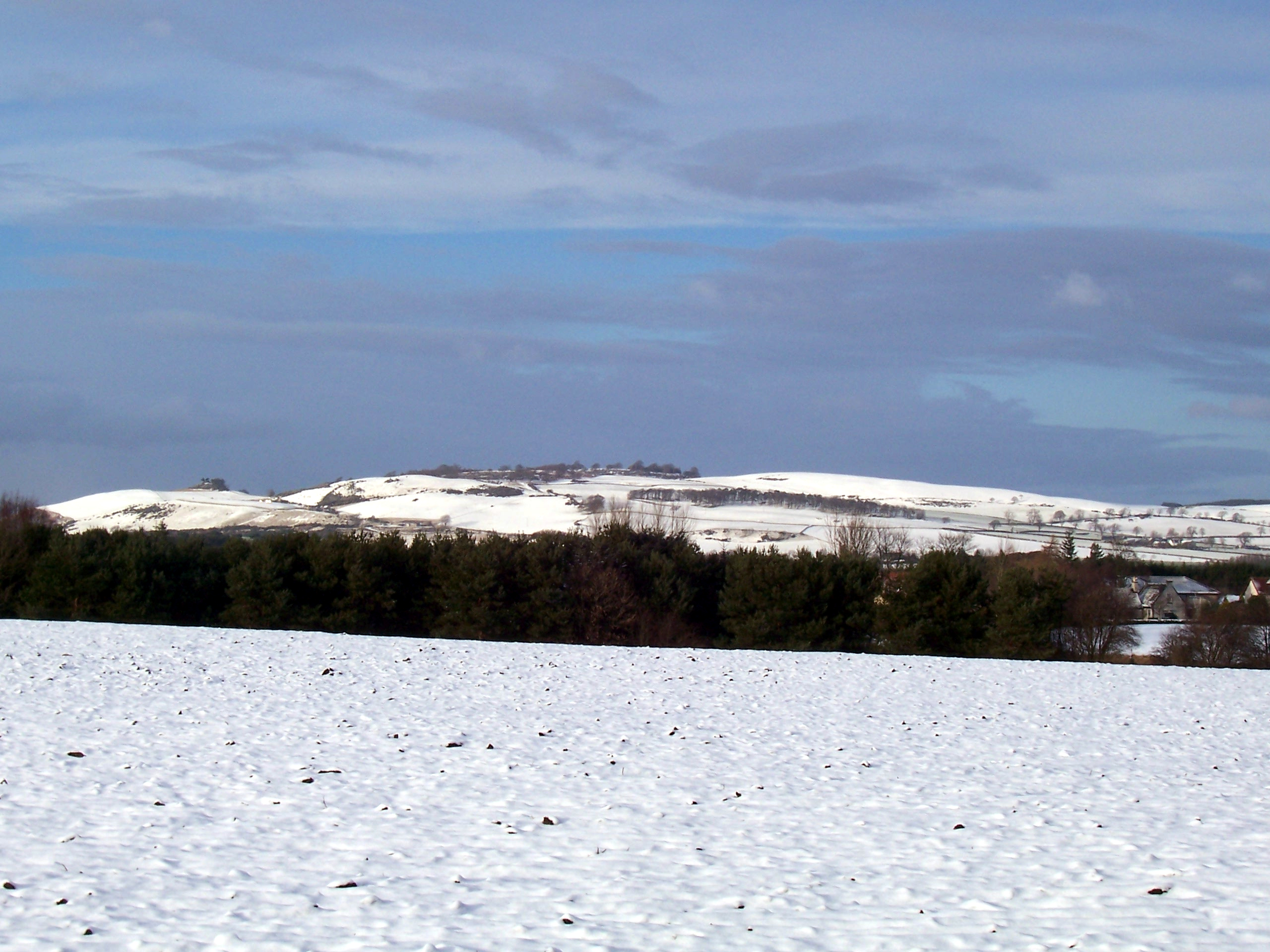
- Cairnie Hill from the Howe of Fife

Highest point
- Elevation: 228 m (748 ft)
- Prominence: 150 m (490 ft)
- Listing: Marilyn

Geography
- Location within Scotland
- Location: Fife, Scotland
- Parent range: Ochil Hills
- OS grid: NO279155
- Topo map: OS Landranger 59

Cairnie Hill lies at the eastern end of the Ochil Hills, above the village of Collessie Scotland. It is the highest point of a small upland area between Collesie Den and Collairnie Farm. The northern and western slopes of Cairnie Hill are quite steep and are used for rough grazing and forestry. To the south the land rises gradually from the flat Howe of Fife and is used predominantly for arable farming.

Cairnie is a common place name in Fife, possibly originating from the Pictish Carden or thicket, with the addition of the Gaelic ending aigh. It is also Scots for 'hillock'.

An easy route to the summit starts at NO 273153, on the B937 about 2 km south of Lindores. From here a track leads up onto the summit area, from where several paths lead to the summit.
