= Davie Cairns =

Scottish footballer

Personal information
- Full name: David Cairns
- Date of birth: 9 February 1951 (age 75)
- Place of birth: St Andrews, Scotland
- Position: Left back

Youth career
- Greig Park Rangers
- Methil Star Colts
- –1967: Bowhill Youth Club
- 1967–1969: Rangers

Senior career*
Years	Team	Apps	(Gls)
1969	St Johnstone	0	(0)
1969–1970	Shrewsbury Town	0	(0)
1970	Forfar Athletic	21	(1)
1970–1975	Cowdenbeath	143	(5)
1975–1976	Raith Rovers	18	(0)
1976–1977	Berwick Rangers	32	(1)
1977–1979	Brechin City	38	(4)
1979–1980	Leven		
1980–1982	East Fife	16	(0)

Managerial career
- 1979–1980: Leven (assistant)
- * Club domestic league appearances and goals

David Cairns (born 9 February 1951) is a Scottish retired footballer who made over 140 appearances in the Scottish League for Cowdenbeath as a left back. He also played for Brechin City, Berwick Rangers, Forfar Athletic, Raith Rovers and East Fife.

== Career statistics ==
Appearances and goals by club, season and competition
Club	Season	League			Scottish Cup		League Cup		Total	
Club	Season	Division	Apps	Goals	Apps	Goals	Apps	Goals	Apps	Goals
Forfar Athletic	1969–70	Scottish Second Division	12	0	—		—		12	0
Forfar Athletic	1970–71	Scottish Second Division	9	1	1	0	2	0	12	1
Forfar Athletic	Total		21	1	1	0	2	0	24	1
Berwick Rangers	1976–77	Scottish Second Division	32	1	1	0	3	0	36	1
Career total			53	2	2	0	5	0	60	2

== Honours ==
Cowdenbeath

- Fife Cup: 1970–71

Individual

- Cowdenbeath Hall of Fame
