= Kevin Cairns (footballer) =

English footballer

Personal information
- Full name: Kevin William Cairns
- Date of birth: 29 June 1937
- Place of birth: Preston, England
- Date of death: 11 September 2017 (aged 80)
- Place of death: Lostock Hall, Lancashire, England
- Height: 5 ft 7 in (1.70 m)
- Position: Left back

Youth career
- Preston North End

Senior career*
Years	Team	Apps	(Gls)
1960–1962	Dundee United	22	(0)
1962–1968	Southport	206	(1)
1968–1969	Wigan Athletic	9	(0)
- * Club domestic league appearances and goals

Kevin William Cairns (29 June 1937 – 11 September 2017) was an English footballer who played as a left back in the Scottish Football League for Dundee United and in the Football League for Southport, where he spent most of his career.

== Playing career ==
Cairns was briefly attached to Blackburn Rovers as a youngster, and also played non-League football for Weymouth and Carshalton Athletic. During his National Service, he played in an Army match alongside Dundee United's Ron Yeats, who recommended him to the club. Cairns signed for Dundee United in September 1960, making his debut that month in a Scottish Football League match against St Johnstone. After being a first team regular in his first season, Cairns made only one appearance in 1961–62 and was given a free transfer by Dundee United in May 1962. He signed for Southport in August 1962, going on to make 206 appearances in the Football League over the next six years. He then played non-league football for Wigan Athletic, where he played four games in the Cheshire League, and made a further five appearances in the Northern Premier League.
