= Ben Cleuch =

Hill in the Central Lowlands of Scotland

Coordinates: 56.1858°N 3.7698°W

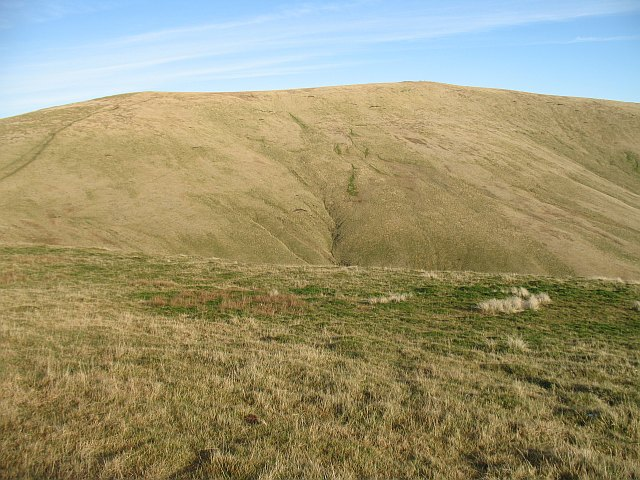

Highest point
- Elevation: 721 m (2,365 ft)
- Prominence: 595 m (1,952 ft)
- Listing: Ma,Hu,Tu,Sim, G, D,CoH,CoU,DN,Y,P500

Naming
- Native name: Scottish Gaelic: Beinn Cloiche
- English translation: Stony (cloiche) prominent mountain (beinn)

Geography
- Location within Clackmannanshire Location within Scotland
- Location: Clackmannanshire, Scotland
- Parent range: Ochil Hills
- OS grid: NN 90274 00632

Ben Cleuch, from Scottish Gaelic: Beinn Cloiche, lit. 'stony prominent hill' (though likely influenced by the Scots word cleugh meaning "ravine", which some sources derive the name from) is a hill in the Ochil Hills range, part of the Central Lowlands of Scotland. It is the highest point in the range, Clackmannanshire and the Central Belt of Scotland; the summit is marked by a trig point within a stone windshelter and a viewpoint indicator.

== Features ==
On a clear day, the views are excellent, particularly those to the north looking towards the Southern Highlands. Ben Lomond (Beinn Laomainn), Ben Ledi (Beinn Lididh), Stùc a' Chroin and Ben Vorlich (Beinn Mhùrlaig) are especially prominent. Looking to the south gives excellent views over the Forth Valley region, the Forth bridges and Edinburgh to the east, Glasgow to the west: almost a coast to coast view but not quite.

== Geodesy ==
Ben Cleuch was the origin (meridian) of the six-inch and 1:2500 Ordnance Survey maps of the counties of Perth and Clackmannan.

== Subsidiary SMC Summits ==
Summit	Height (m)	Listing
Andrew Gannel Hill	670	Tu,Sim,DT,GT,DN
The Law	638.3	DT,sSim
Ben Ever	622	Tu,Sim,DT,GT,DN
