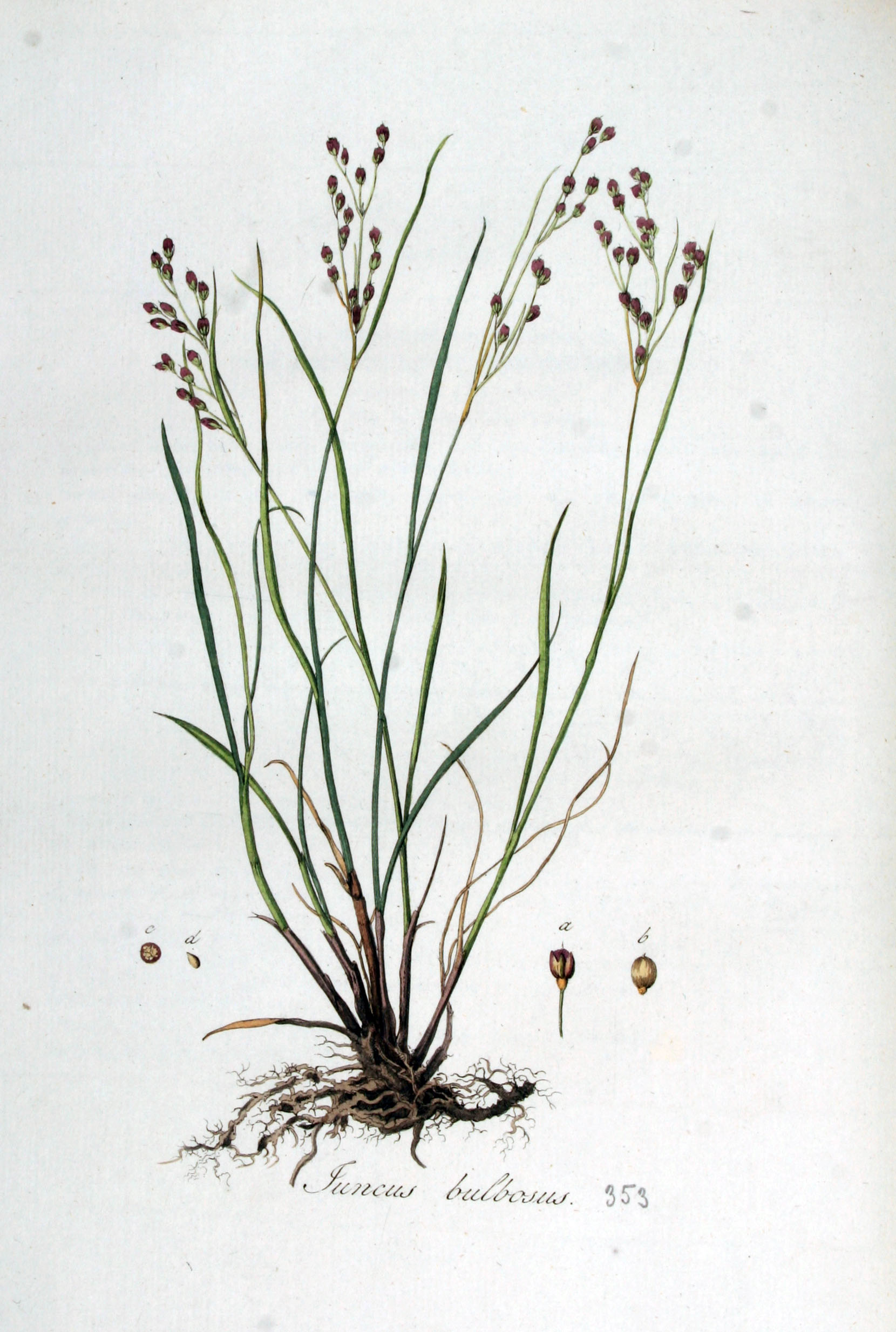
- Botanical illustration
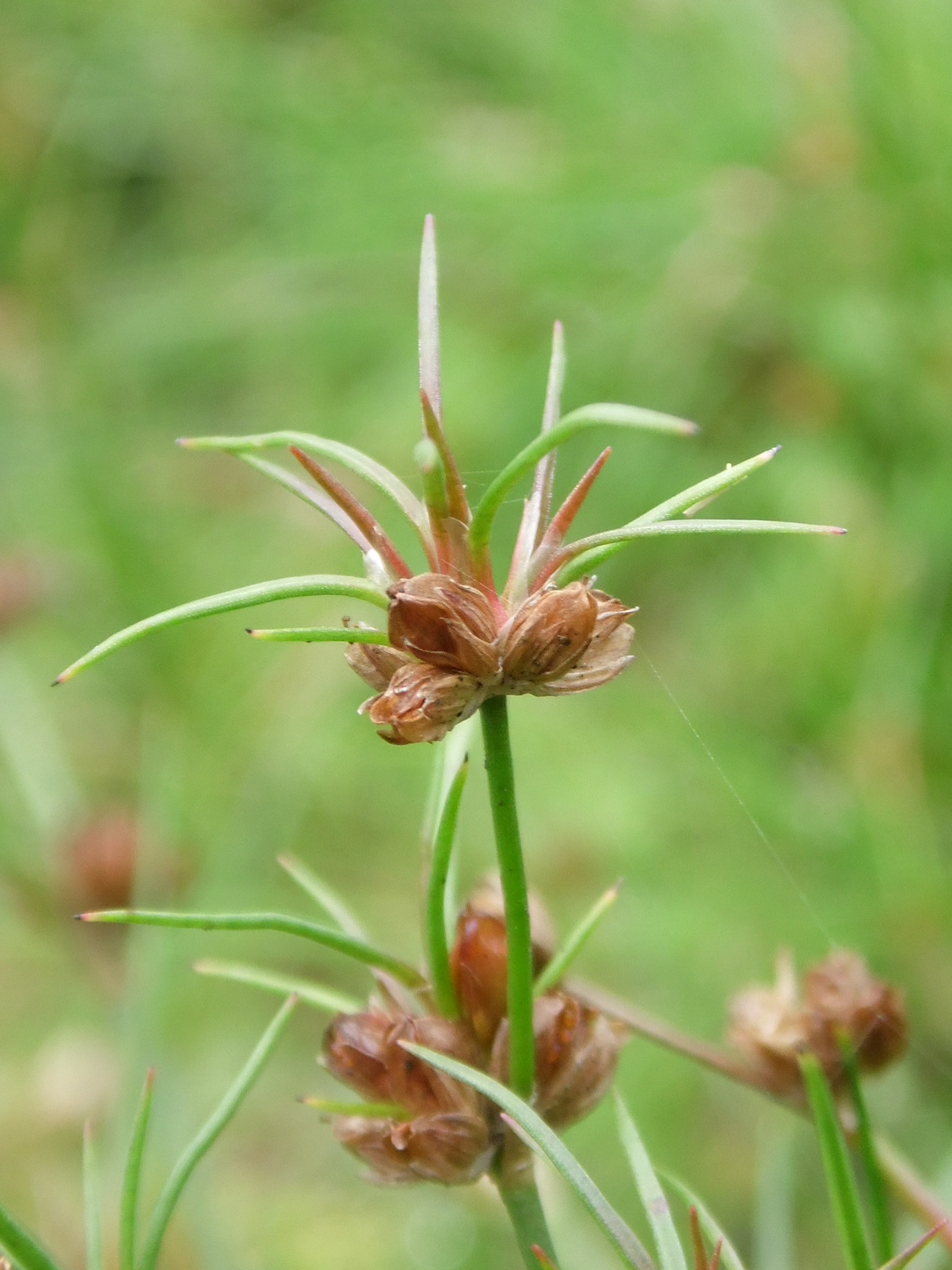
- Inflorescence

Scientific classification
- Kingdom: Plantae
- Clade: Tracheophytes
- Clade: Angiosperms
- Clade: Monocots
- Clade: Commelinids
- Order: Poales
- Family: Juncaceae
- Genus: Juncus
- Species: J. bulbosus

Binomial name
- Juncus bulbosus L.

Synonyms
- List: Juncus annuus Krock.; Juncus bulbosus f. geniculatus (Asch. & Graebn.) Soó; Juncus bulbosus f. nanus (Peterm.) Soó; Juncus bulbosus f. submersus (Glück) Soó; Juncus bulbosus f. submucronatus Procków; Juncus bulbosus f. uliginosus (Roth) Fern.-Carv.; Juncus bulbosus f. welwitschii (Hochst. ex Steud.) Soó; Juncus confervaceus St.-Lag.; Juncus fluitans Lam.; Juncus kochii F.W.Schultz; Juncus setifolius Ehrh.; Juncus subverticillatus Wulfen; Juncus supinus Moench; Juncus supinus var. fluitans (Lam.) Fr.; Juncus uliginosus Roth; Juncus verticillatus Pers.; Juncus viviparus Relhan; Juncus welwitschii Hochst. ex Steud.; Phylloschoenus supinus (Moench) Fourr.; Tristemon uliginosus (Roth) Raf.

= Juncus bulbosus =

Species of rush

Juncus bulbosus, the bulbous rush, is a species of flowering plant in the family Juncaceae, native to Iceland, the Faroes, Europe, Macaronesia, and northwest Africa. It has been introduced to Australia, New Zealand, and some locations in northern North America. It is capable of nuisance growth in lakes and streams.
