= Clackmannanshire Council elections =

Local government elections in Scotland

Clackmannanshire Council in Scotland holds elections every five years, previously holding them every four years from its creation as a single-tier authority in 1995 to 2007.

== Council elections ==
=== As a district council ===
Year	SNP	Labour	Conservative	Independent
1974	6	5	0	1
1977	8	3	1	0
1980 (Note: New ward boundaries.)	4	7	1	0
1984	2	9	1	0
1988	1	10	1	0
1992	3	8	1	0

=== As a unitary authority ===
Year	SNP	Labour	Conservative	Green	Liberal Democrats	Independent
1995	3	8	1	0	0	0
1999 (Note: New ward boundaries.)	9	8	1	0	0	0
2003	6	10	1	0	0	1
2007 (Note: Change to single transferable vote system and new ward boundaries.)	7	8	1	0	1	1
2012	8	8	1	0	0	1
2017 (Note: New ward boundaries.)	8	5	5	0	0	0
2022	9	5	3	1	0	0

== Results maps ==
1999 results map

2003 results map

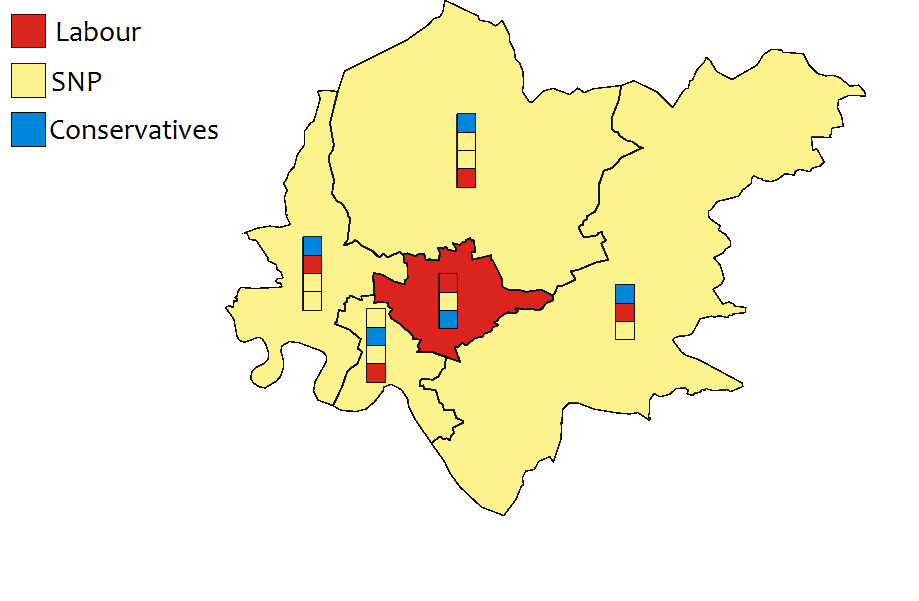
2017 results map

2022 results map

== By-elections ==
=== 2003-2007 ===
Menstrie By-Election 19 August 2004
Party	Candidate	Votes	%	±%
SNP	Janis Paterson	403	56.2	+28.1
Labour	Haldis Scott	138	19.2	+6.4
Conservative	Richard Sullivan	108	15.1	+15.1
Scottish Socialist	Charles Gillan	37	5.2	+5.2
Liberal Democrats	Charle Bell	31	4.3	+4.3
Majority		265	37.0	
Turnout		717		
SNP gain from Independent				

Tillicoutry West By-Election 19 August 2004
Party	Candidate	Votes	%	±%
SNP	Helen McGregor	262	36.8	−12.6
Labour	Joanne Ross	176	24.8	−8.9
Independent	William Whyte	128	18.0	+18.0
Liberal Democrats	John Biggam	86	12.1	+12.1
Conservative	Alan Jamieson	59	8.3	+8.3
Majority		86	12.1	
Turnout		711		
SNP hold				

Clackmannan By-Election 2 December 2004
Party	Candidate	Votes	%	±%
Labour	Harry McLaren	498	54.4	−10.5
SNP	Craig Hutchinson	292	31.9	−3.2
Conservative	Richard Sullivan	54	5.9	+5.9
Independent	William Whyte	48	5.2	+5.2
Liberal Democrats	John Biggam	24	2.6	+2.6
Majority		206	22.5	
Turnout		916		
Labour hold				

=== 2017-2022 ===
Clackmannanshire North By-Election 1 March 2018
Party	Candidate	FPv%	Count				
Party	Candidate	FPv%	1	2	3	4	5
SNP	Helen Lewis	36.8	769	795	818	980	1,128
Conservative	Alex Stewart	31.5	658	661	693	784	
Labour	Afifa Khanam	23.6	493	513	538		
Liberal Democrats	Damian Sherwood-Johnson	4.0	84	101			
Green	Marion Robertson	3.5	74				
SNP hold							
Valid: 2,078 Spoilt: 14 Quota: 1,040 Turnout: 2,092

Clackmannanshire Central By-Election 28 March 2019
Party	Candidate	FPv%	Count					
Party	Candidate	FPv%	1	2	3	4	5	6
SNP	Jane McTaggart	40.9	865	872	888	902	933	1,166
Labour	Margaret Brookes	31.9	675	684	696	702	814	
Conservative	William Marlin	19.8	419	423	433	447		
UKIP	Dawson Michie	3.3	69	70	74			
Green	Marion Robertson	2.5	53	60				
Liberal Democrats	John Biggam	1.7	36					
SNP hold								

Clackmannanshire East By-Election 19 November 2020
Party	Candidate	FPv%	Count
Party	Candidate	FPv%	1
Conservative	Denis Coyne	51.2	1,226
SNP	Stephen Leitch	32.0	766
Labour	Carolynne Hunter	8.1	195
Green	Marion Robertson	5.8	139
Liberal Democrats	Jim Hay	2.9	69
Conservative hold			
Valid: 2,395 Spoilt: 19 Quota: 1,198 Turnout: 2,414
