= Clackmannanshire Council =

Local authority for Clackmannanshire, Scotland

Clackmannanshire Council Comhairle Siorrachd Chlach Mhanann
- Coat of arms

- Clackmannanshire Council logo

Type
- Type: Unitary Authority

History
- Preceded by: Clackmannan District Council (1975-1996)

Leadership
- Convener: Phil Fairlie, SNP since 25 May 2022
- Leader: Ellen Forson, SNP since 12 Apr 2018
- Chief Executive: Nikki Bridle since July 2018

Structure
- Seats: 18 councillors
- Graph of the party split among 18 seats.
- Political groups: Administration (8) SNP (8) Other parties (10) Labour (5) Conservative (3) Green (1) Independent (1)

Elections
- Voting system: Single transferable vote
- Last election: 5 May 2022
- Next election: 6 May 2027

Meeting place
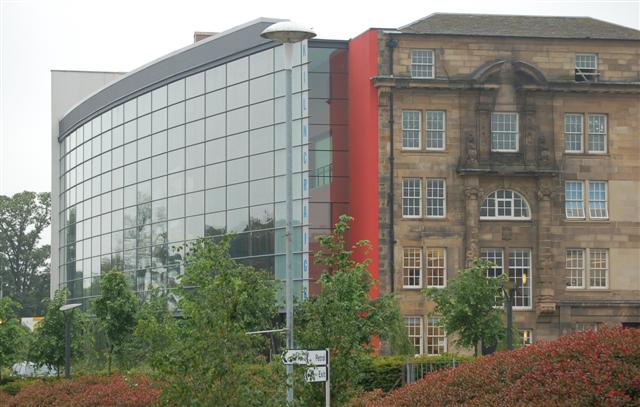
- Kilncraigs, Greenside Street, Alloa, FK10 1EB

Website
- www.clacks.gov.uk

Clackmannanshire Council (Scottish Gaelic: Comhairle Siorrachd Chlach Mhanann) is the local government authority for the Clackmannanshire council area.

== History ==
=== Shire of Clackmannan (c. 1200-1889) ===
Clackmannanshire's origins as a shire (the area controlled by a sheriff) are unclear; it had certainly become a shire by 1305, with some suggestion that it may have already existed in the early 1200s.

The county town was originally Clackmannan, where the tolbooth was built in 1592 to serve as the sheriff court for the county. Commissioners of Supply were established in 1667 to act as the main administrative body for the shire. In 1822 the sheriff court and meeting place of the commissioners was moved from Clackmannan to Alloa, which had grown to become the more significant town. County Buildings was built in 1865 at the corner of Mar Street and Drysdale Street in Alloa to serve as the courthouse and meeting place for the commissioners.

=== Clackmannanshire County Council (1890-1975) ===
Clackmannanshire County Council was established under the Local Government (Scotland) Act 1889, officially taking office in May 1890. The county council took over the administrative duties previously held by the unelected Commissioners of Supply and the Justices of the peace. Headquartered in the county town of Alloa, the council initially oversaw basic regional infrastructure, including roads, public health, and sanitation. Over the course of the 20th century, its remit expanded significantly to include public education and the construction of social housing, remaining the area's primary governing body until its abolition in 1975

The 1889 act also led to a review of boundaries, with several exclaves being transferred to a county they actually bordered, and parishes which straddled more than one county being adjusted such that each parish was entirely in a single county. These changes saw Clackmannanshire cede Cambuskenneth to Stirlingshire, whilst it gained Alva from Stirlingshire and parts of Alloa parish which had been in Perthshire.

=== Clackmannan District Council (1975-1996) ===
Following the major local government overhaul mandated by the Local Government (Scotland) Act 1973, the old county structure was dissolved in favour of a two-tier system, Clackmannanshire became Clackmannan District Council, within Central Regional Council. Clackmannan District council covered the pre-1975 county plus the parish of Muckhart, which had been in Perthshire prior to 1975.

Under this two-tier framework, most powers, including, education, social work, police, and fire services, were reserved to the Central Regional Council in Stirling. Clackmannan District Council was left with only local responsibilities, such as housing management, planning applications, parks, and bin collection.

=== Clackmannanshire Council (1996-Present) ===
Local government was reorganised again in 1996 under the Local Government etc. (Scotland) Act 1994, abolishing the two-tier large regional and local district council system in favour of medium size unitary councils. Unitary councils provide all local government services. Clackmannan district became one of the new council areas, taking on the functions of the abolished Central Regional Council. The 1994 act originally named the new council area "Clackmannan", but the shadow authority elected in 1995 requested a change of name to "Clackmannanshire", which was agreed by the government before the new council area came into force on 1 April 1996.

Clackmannanshire, being the smallest mainland council, commonly known as the "Wee County" faced some financial struggles when transitioning to a unitary council. For example, in the early 2000s Clackmannanshire had to build three new schools. Due to a lack of central funding alternatives, they entered into a private finance initiative (PFI) deal, as the option at the time was taking a PFI deal, or receiving no funding at all, in which case they would fail to reach their statutory education requirements. In 2025, the council was spending 52p of every £1 raised on the PFI interest. It is expected that the loan payments will peak in 2029, and the contract will conclude in 2041.

== Governance ==
=== Political control ===
The council has been under no overall control since 2007. It has been run by a Scottish National Party minority administration since 2017.

The first election to Clackmannan District Council was held in 1974, initially operating as a shadow authority alongside the outgoing authorities until the new system came into force on 16 May 1975. A shadow authority was again elected in 1995 ahead of the change to council areas which came into force on 1 April 1996. Political control since 1975 has been as follows:

Clackmannan District Council
| Party in control | Years |
|---|---|
| No overall control | 1975–1977 |
| SNP | 1977–1980 |
| Labour | 1980–1996 |

Clackmannanshire Council
| Party in control | Years |
|---|---|
| Labour | 1996–1999 |
| No overall control | 1999–2000 |
| SNP | 2000–2003 |
| Labour | 2003–2007 |
| No overall control | 2007–present |

=== Leadership ===
The role of convener is largely ceremonial in Clackmannanshire. They chair full council meetings and act as the council's civic figurehead. Political leadership is provided by the leader of the council. The leaders since 1996 have been:

| Councillor | Party | From | To |
|---|---|---|---|
| Teresa McNally | Labour | 1 Apr 1996 | Feb 1998 |
| Jim Watson | Labour | Feb 1998 | May 1999 |
| Keith Brown | SNP | May 1999 | 2003 |
| Margaret Paterson | Labour | 2003 | May 2007 |
| Janet Cadenhead | Labour | 24 May 2007 | 23 Sep 2010 |
| Sam Ovens | Labour | 23 Sep 2010 | 6 Jan 2012 |
| Gary Womersley | SNP | 6 Jan 2012 | 3 Nov 2014 |
| Les Sharp | SNP | 3 Nov 2014 | 12 May 2016 |
| Bobby McGill | Labour | 2 Jun 2016 | 21 Feb 2017 |
| Graham Watt | Labour | 23 Feb 2017 | 23 Feb 2017 |
| Les Sharp | SNP | 9 Mar 2017 | Apr 2018 |
| Ellen Forson | SNP | 12 Apr 2018 | |

=== Composition ===
Following the 2022 election and a subsequent change of allegiance in December 2022, the composition of the council was:

| Party | Seats |
|---|---|
| SNP | 8 |
| Labour | 5 |
| Conservative | 3 |
| Green | 1 |
| Independent | 1 |
| Total | 18 |

The next election is due in 2027.

=== Premises ===
Since 2014, the council has been based at Kilncraigs, on Greenside Street in Alloa.

After the 1975 local government reorganisation, the old meeting place of Clackmannanshire County Council at the County Buildings reverted to being solely a courthouse, and the old county council's offices in converted houses along nearby Marshill passed to the Central Regional Council. Clackmannan District Council acquired a modern office building called The Whins on Whins Road to serve as its headquarters, and also took over the former Alloa Town Council building at Greenfield House on Mar Place.

Greenfield House had been built as a house in 1894 and had been bought by the old town council in 1952, with its gardens becoming a public park. In 1987 Greenfield House was extended, allowing it to become the district council's headquarters, with The Whins subsequently being turned into the Alloa Business Centre. Greenfield House then served as the council's headquarters until 2014.

In 2014 the council moved to Kilncraigs, which had been built in 1904 as the offices, factory and warehouse of John Paton, Son and Co, manufacturers of knitting yarn. After the factory closed the whole building had been converted to offices in 2004.

== Elections ==
Since 2007 elections have been held every five years under the single transferable vote system, introduced by the Local Governance (Scotland) Act 2004. Election results since 1995 have been as follows:

| Year | Seats | SNP | Labour | Conservative | Green | Liberal Democrats | Independent / Other | Notes |
|---|---|---|---|---|---|---|---|---|
| 1995 | 12 | 3 | 8 | 1 | 0 | 0 | 0 | |
| 1999 | 18 | 9 | 8 | 1 | 0 | 0 | 0 | New ward boundaries. |
| 2003 | 18 | 6 | 10 | 1 | 0 | 0 | 1 | |
| 2007 | 18 | 7 | 8 | 1 | 0 | 1 | 1 | New ward boundaries. |
| 2012 | 18 | 8 | 8 | 1 | 0 | 0 | 1 | |
| 2017 | 18 | 8 | 5 | 5 | 0 | 0 | 0 | New ward boundaries. |
| 2022 | 18 | 9 | 5 | 3 | 1 | 0 | 0 | |

=== Wards ===
Since 2007, the council area has been divided into five multi-member wards:

| Ward number | Location | Ward name | Settlements | Seats | Population (2019) |
|---|---|---|---|---|---|
| 1 | | Clackmannanshire West | Menstrie, Glenochil, Tullibody, Cambus | 4 | 12,606 |
| 2 | | Clackmannanshire North | Alva, Tillicoultry, Coalsnaughton | 4 | 10,731 |
| 3 | | Clackmannanshire Central | Sauchie, Fishcross, Alloa (Note: Clackmannanshire Central covers north-eastern parts of Alloa (Branshill, Fairfield, Hallpark, Whins, Woodlea).) | 3 | 7,936 |
| 4 | | Clackmannanshire South | Alloa (Note: Clackmannanshire South covers most of Alloa other than north-eastern parts and the modern Alloa Park development in the south-east.) | 4 | 11,618 |
| 5 | | Clackmannanshire East | Clackmannan, Dollar, Muckhart, Kennet, Forestmill, Solsgirth, Alloa (Note: Clackmannanshire East covers the Alloa Park development since 2017 – the addition of which was the only boundary change in a 2017 national review.) | 3 | 8,649 |
| Total | | | | 18 | 51,540 |

== Communities ==
The council area is divided into nine community council areas, eight of which have community councils as at 2023, being those marked with an asterisk below.

- Alloa*
- Alva*
- Clackmannan*
- Dollar*
- Menstrie*
- Muckhart*
- Sauchie and Fishcross*
- Tillicoultry, Coalsnaughton and Devonside*
- Tullibody, Cambus, and Glenochil
