= Clackmannanshire and Dunblane =

Region or constituency of the Scottish Parliament

- County constituency for the Scottish Parliament
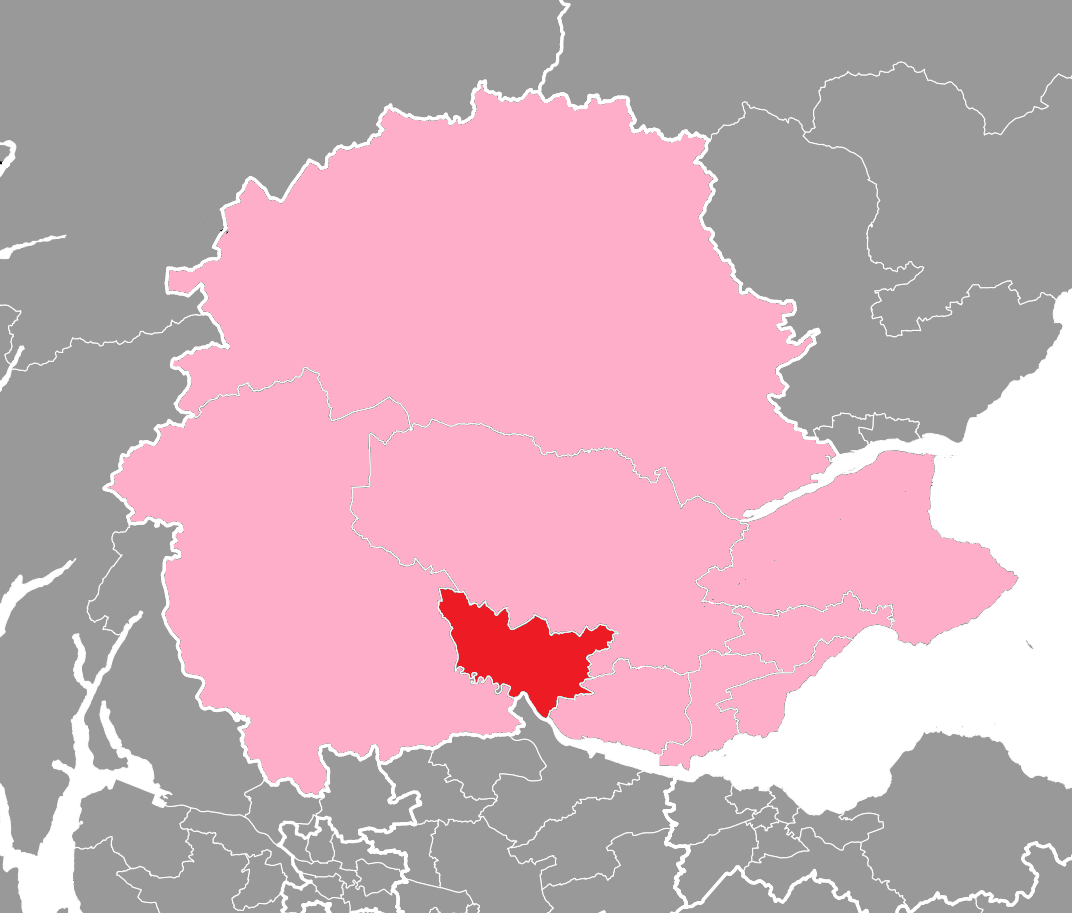

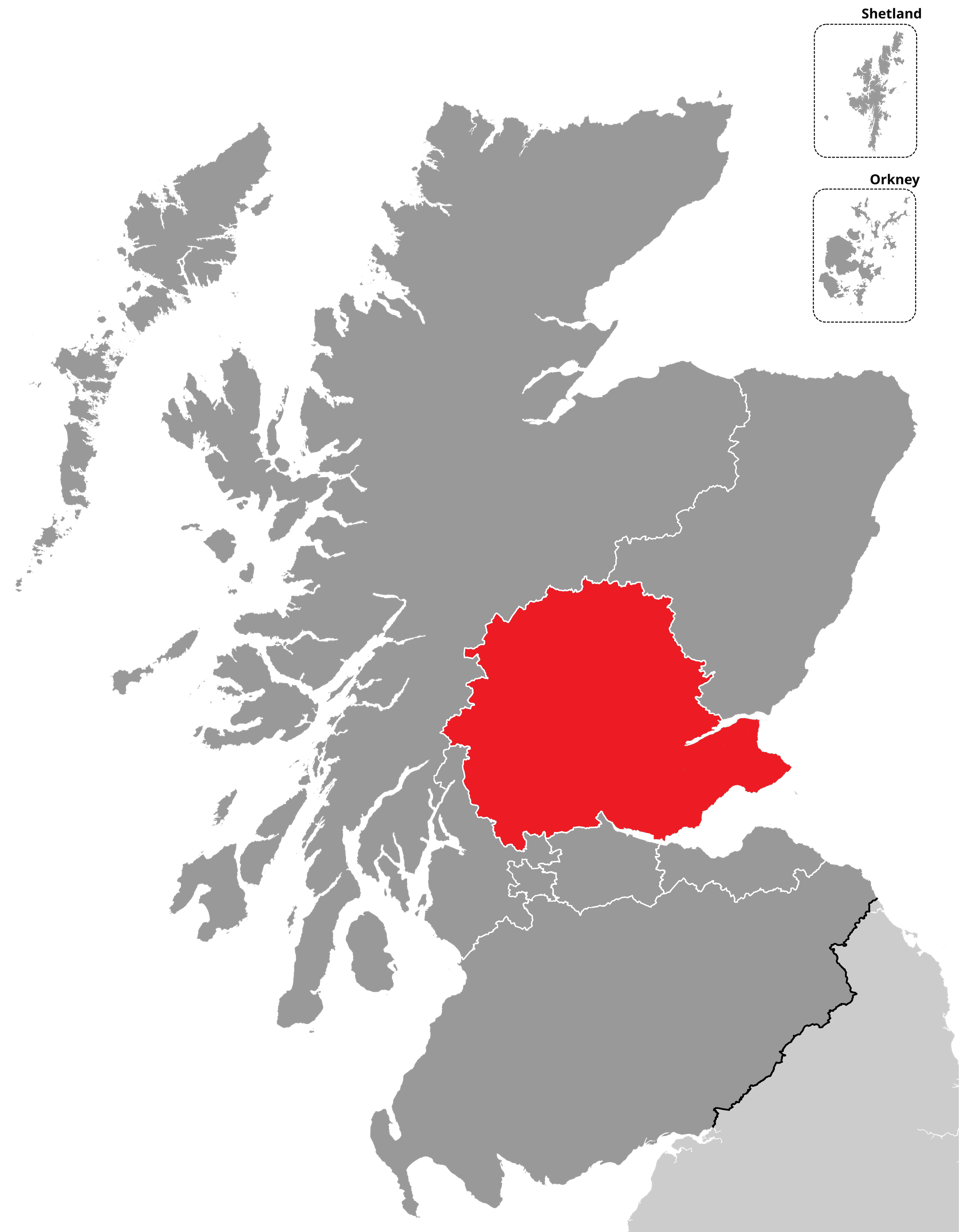
- Clackmannanshire and Dunblane shown within the Mid Scotland and Fife electoral region, and the region shown within Scotland
- Electoral region: Mid Scotland and Fife
- Electorate: 57,113 (2026)

Current constituency
- Created: 2011
- Party: Scottish National Party
- MSP: Keith Brown
- Council area: Clackmannanshire; Stirling

Clackmannanshire and Dunblane (Gaelic: Siorrachd Chlach Mhanann agus Dùn Bhlàthain) is a county constituency of the Scottish Parliament covering part of the Stirling council area and the entirety of Clackmannanshire. It elects one Member of the Scottish Parliament (MSP) by the first past the post method of election. Under the additional-member electoral system used for elections to the Scottish Parliament, it is also one of nine constituencies in the Mid Scotland and Fife electoral region, which elects seven additional members, in addition to the nine constituency MSPs, to produce a form of proportional representation for the region as a whole. Created in 2011, the constituency covers much of the area previously in the abolished Ochil constituency.

The seat has been held by Keith Brown of the Scottish National Party since its creation; Brown was previously the MSP for the preceding constituency of Ochil.

== Electoral region ==
The other eight constituencies of the Mid Scotland and Fife region are: Cowdenbeath, Dunfermline, Kirkcaldy, Mid Fife and Glenrothes, Fife North East, Perthshire North, Perthshire South and Kinross-shire and Stirling. The region covers all of the Clackmannanshire council area, all of the Fife council area, all of the Perth and Kinross council area and all of the Stirling council area.

== Constituency boundaries and council areas ==
Map of boundaries (2011-2025)

The constituency was created for the 2011 Scottish Parliament election and largely replaced the former constituency of Ochil, also drawing some areas that were formerly in the Stirling constituency. It covers all of the Clackmannanshire council area, whilst the rest of the Stirling council area is covered by the Stirling constituency.

The electoral wards used in the creation of Clackmannanshire and Dunblane for the 2011 election were:

- Clackmannanshire Council wards (entire council area):
  - Clackmannanshire Central (entire ward)
  - Clackmannanshire East (entire ward)
  - Clackmannanshire North (entire ward)
  - Clackmannanshire South (entire ward)
  - Clackmannanshire West (entire ward)
- Stirling Council wards:
  - Dunblane and Bridge of Allan

At the second periodic review of Scottish Parliament boundaries in 2025 the seat boundaries were slightly altered to address the difference in electorate size between the Stirling and Clackmannanshire and Dunblane seats. A portion of the Stirling North ward of Stirling council was added to the seat, with the rest of this ward remaining in the Stirling constituency. The area added is the Causewayhead area of Stirling, making the River Forth the southern boundary of the seat.

== Member of the Scottish Parliament ==
Election	Member	Party
2011	Keith Brown	Scottish National Party

== Election results ==
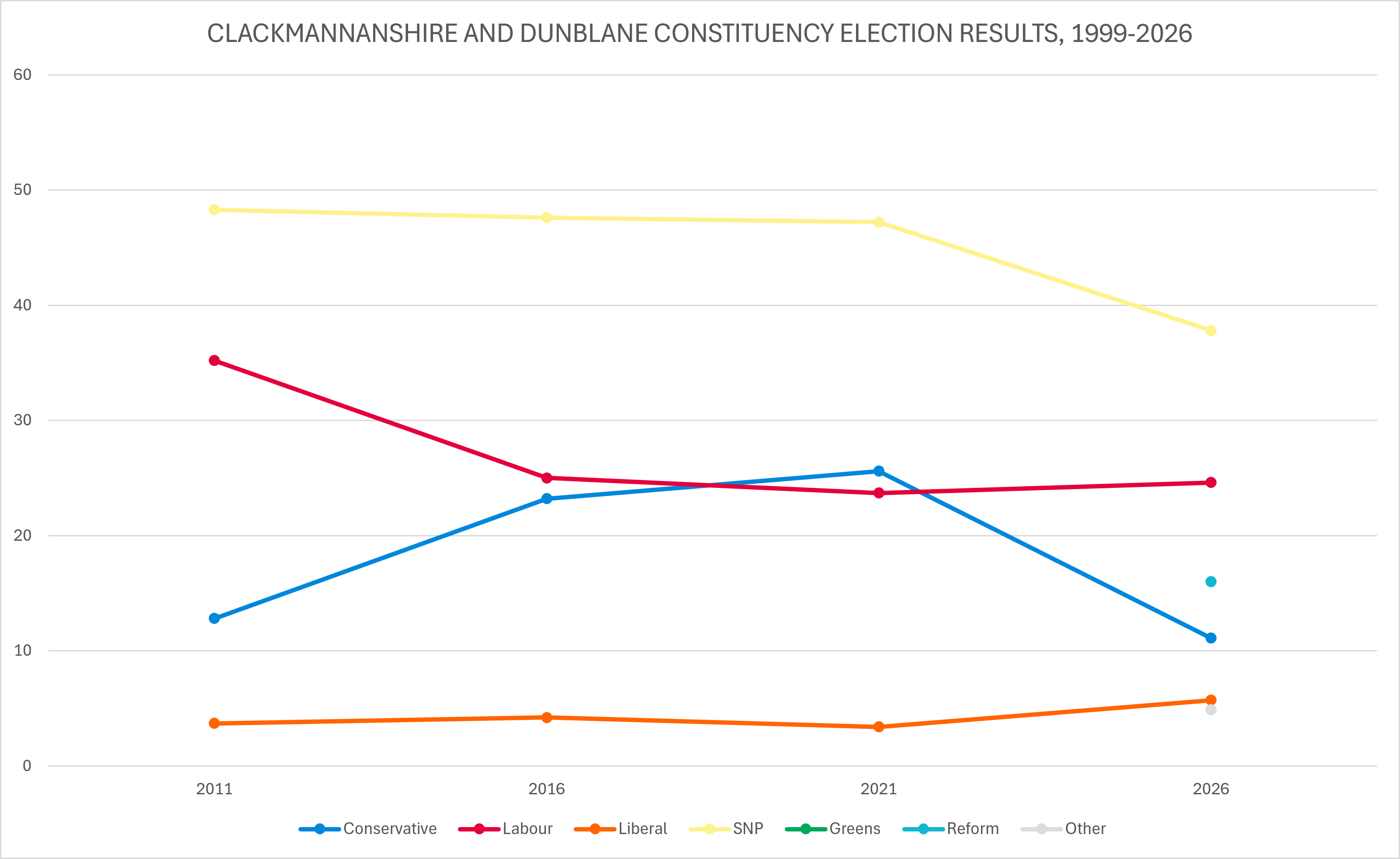
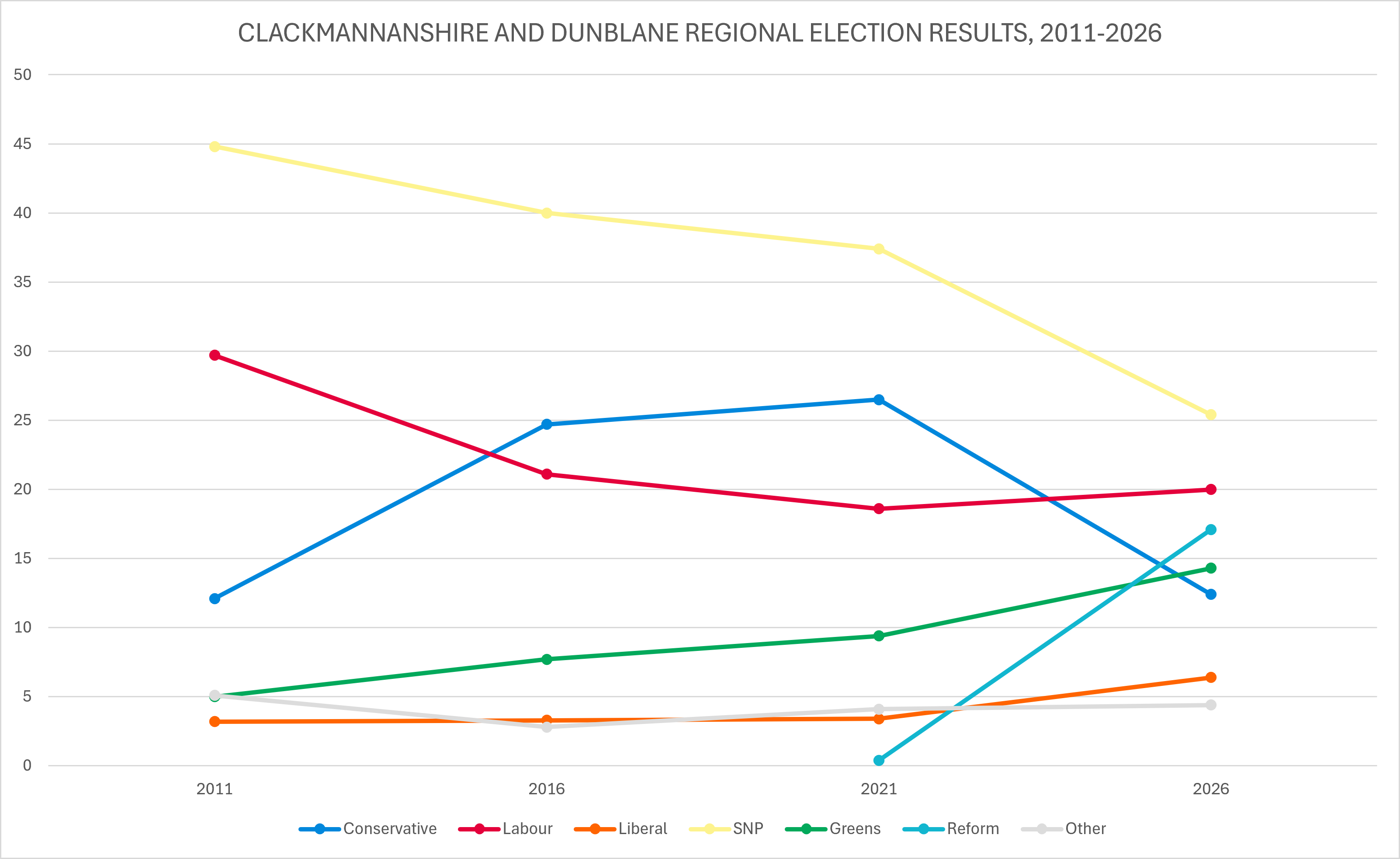

=== 2020s ===
2026 Scottish Parliament election: Clackmannanshire and Dunblane (Note: Note that changes in vote share are shown with respect to the notional result of the 2021 election, calculated to account for boundary changes)
Party	Candidate	Constituency			Regional		
Party	Candidate	Votes	%	±%	Votes	%	±%
SNP	Keith Brown (Note: Incumbent member for this constituency)	12,222	37.8	▼9.6	8,090	25.4	▼12.0
Labour	Suzanne Grahame	7,958	24.6	▲1.8	6,357	20.0	▲1.4
Reform	Mike Collier	5,181	16.0	New	5,437	17.1	▲16.7
Green					4,553	14.3	▲9.4
Conservative	Alexander Stewart (Note: Incumbent member on the party list, or for another constituency)	3,592	11.1	▼15.3	3,942	12.4	▼14.1
Liberal Democrats	Sally Pattle	1,841	5.7	▲2.3	2,043	6.4	▲3.0
AtLS	Eva Comrie	1,228	3.8	New	502	1.6	New
Independent Green Voice					369	1.2	New
Independent	Luca Scacchi	345	1.1	New			
ISP					194	0.6	New
Scottish Family					180	0.6	Steady
Scottish Socialist					73	0.2	New
Advance UK					45	0.1	New
Scottish Libertarian					29	0.1	▼0.5
Majority		4,264	13.2	▼8.4			
Valid votes		32,367			31,814		
Invalid votes		118			77		
Turnout		32,485	56.9	▼9.5	31,891	55.8	▼10.6
SNP hold		Swing					
Notes

2021 Scottish Parliament election: Clackmannanshire and Dunblane
Party	Candidate	Constituency			Regional		
Party	Candidate	Votes	%	±%	Votes	%	±%
SNP	Keith Brown (Note: Incumbent member for this constituency)	16,504	47.2	▼0.4	13,077	37.4	▼2.6
Conservative	Alexander Stewart (Note: Incumbent member on the party list, or for another constituency)	8,953	25.6	▲2.4	9,281	26.5	▲1.8
Labour	Craig Miller	8,292	23.7	▼1.3	6,522	18.6	▼2.5
Green					3,306	9.4	▲1.7
Liberal Democrats	Iliyan Stefanov	1,194	3.4	▼0.8	1,179	3.4	▲0.1
Alba					594	1.7	New
Scottish Libertarian					227	0.6	▲0.4
All for Unity					208	0.6	New
Scottish Family					198	0.6	New
Reform					147	0.4	New
Abolish the Scottish Parliament					104	0.3	New
Freedom Alliance (UK)					75	0.2	New
UKIP					46	0.1	▼1.6
Independent	Martin Keatings				25	0.0	New
Renew					12	0.0	New
Independent	Mercy Kamanja				2	0.0	New
Majority		7,551	21.6	▼1.0			
Valid votes		34,943			35,003		
Invalid votes		135			87		
Turnout		35,078	66.4	▲7.3	35,090	66.4	▲7.4
SNP hold		Swing					

=== 2010s ===
2016 Scottish Parliament election: Clackmannanshire and Dunblane
Party	Candidate	Constituency			Region		
Party	Candidate	Votes	%	±%	Votes	%	±%
SNP	Keith Brown (Note: Incumbent member for this constituency)	14,147	47.6	▼0.7	12,044	40.0	▼4.8
Labour	Craig Miller	7,426	25.0	▼10.2	6,300	21.1	▼8.6
Conservative	Alexander Stewart (Note: Elected on the party list)	6,915	23.2	▲10.4	7,363	24.7	▲12.6
Green					2,298	7.7	▲2.7
Liberal Democrats	Christopher McKinlay	1,258	4.2	▲0.5	979	3.3	▲0.1
UKIP					502	1.7	▲0.8
Scottish Libertarian					59	0.2	New
Solidarity					91	0.3	▲0.2
RISE					167	0.6	New
Majority		6,721	22.6	▲9.5			
Valid votes		29,746			29,803		
Invalid votes		113			50		
Turnout		29,859	59.1	▲3.5	29,853	59.0	▲3.4
SNP hold		Swing					
Notes

2011 Scottish Parliament election: Clackmannanshire and Dunblane
Party	Candidate	Constituency			Region		
Party	Candidate	Votes	%	±%	Votes	%	±%
SNP	Keith Brown (Note: Incumbent member on the party list, or for another constituency)	13,253	48.3	N/A	12,274	44.8	N/A
Labour	Richard Simpson	9,644	35.2	N/A	8,148	29.7	N/A
Conservative	Callum Campbell	3,501	12.8	N/A	3,328	12.1	N/A
Green					1,374	5.0	N/A
Liberal Democrats	Tim Brett	1,018	3.7	N/A	875	3.2	N/A
All-Scotland Pensioners Party					370	1.4	N/A
Socialist Labour					284	1.0	N/A
UKIP					246	0.9	N/A
BNP					178	0.6	N/A
Scottish Socialist					99	0.4	N/A
CPA					86	0.3	N/A
Scottish Christian					83	0.3	N/A
Solidarity					27	0.1	N/A
Independent	Andrew Roger				35	0.1	N/A
Majority		3,609	13.1	N/A			
Valid votes		27,416			27,407		
Invalid votes		77			78		
Turnout		27,493	55.6	N/A	27,485	55.6	N/A
SNP win (new seat)							
