= Alloa and Grangemouth =

UK Parliament constituency (since 2024)

- County constituency for the House of Commons
- Interactive map of boundaries from 2024
- Boundary of Alloa and Grangemouth in Scotland
- Subdivisions of Scotland: Clackmannanshire, Falkirk
- Electorate: 72,265 (March 2020)
- Major settlements: Alloa, Clackmannan, Grangemouth, Tullibody, Larbert, Stenhousemuir

Current constituency
- Created: 2024
- Member of Parliament: Brian Leishman (Labour)
- Seats: One
- Created from: Ochil and South Perthshire, Falkirk & Linlithgow and East Falkirk

Alloa and Grangemouth is a constituency of the House of Commons in the UK Parliament. It was first contested at the 2024 general election, and was won by Brian Leishman of the Labour Party. In July 2025, Leishman was suspended by Labour for "persistent breaches of party discipline.” In November 2025, his whip was restored.

The constituency name refers to the Clackmannanshire town of Alloa and the Falkirk town of Grangemouth.

== Boundaries ==
The constituency comprises the following:

- In full: the Clackmannanshire Council wards of Clackmannanshire Central, Clackmannanshire North, Clackmannanshire South, and Clackmannanshire West; and the Falkirk Council wards of Carse, Kinnaird and Tryst, and Grangemouth.
- In part: the Clackmannanshire Council ward of Clackmannanshire East (part to the south of the A907, including the town of Clackmannan); and the Falkirk Council ward of Bonnybridge and Larbert (northern parts including Larbert).

The parts in Clackmannanshire were previously part of the abolished Ochil and South Perthshire constituency; Grangemouth was previously part of the abolished Linlithgow and East Falkirk constituency; and the remaining parts in Falkirk Council were transferred from the Falkirk constituency.

== Members of Parliament ==
Election	Member	Party
2024	Brian Leishman	Labour
July 2025	Brian Leishman	Independent
November 2025	Brian Leishman	Labour

== Elections ==
=== Elections in the 2020s ===
General election 2024: Alloa and Grangemouth
Party	Candidate	Votes	%	±%
Labour	Brian Leishman	18,039	43.8	+29.3
SNP	John Nicolson	11,917	28.9	−23.8
Reform UK	Richard Fairley	3,804	9.2	+8.8
Conservative	Rachel Nunn	3,127	7.6	−17.2
Green	Nariese Whyte	1,421	3.4	+1.9
Liberal Democrats	Adrian May	1,151	2.8	−2.5
Independent	Eva Comrie	881	2.1	N/A
Alba	Kenny MacAskill	638	1.5	N/A
Workers Party	Tom Flanagan	223	0.5	N/A
Majority		6,122	14.9	N/A
Turnout		41,201	58.3	
Labour gain from SNP		Swing	+26.1	

=== Elections in the 2010s ===
2019 notional result (Note: Estimate of the 2019 general election result as if the revised boundaries recommended under the 2023 boundary review were in place)
Party	Vote	%
SNP	24,050	52.7
Conservative	11,323	24.8
Labour	6,622	14.5
Liberal Democrats	2,426	5.3
Scottish Greens	678	1.5
UKIP	382	0.8
Brexit Party	177	0.4
Majority	12,727	27.9
Turnout	45,658	63.2
Electorate	72,265	
