= Coalsnaughton =

Village in Clackmannanshire, Scotland

Coordinates: 56.1417°N 3.7396°W

Coalsnaughton: Scottish Gaelic: Cois Neachdain
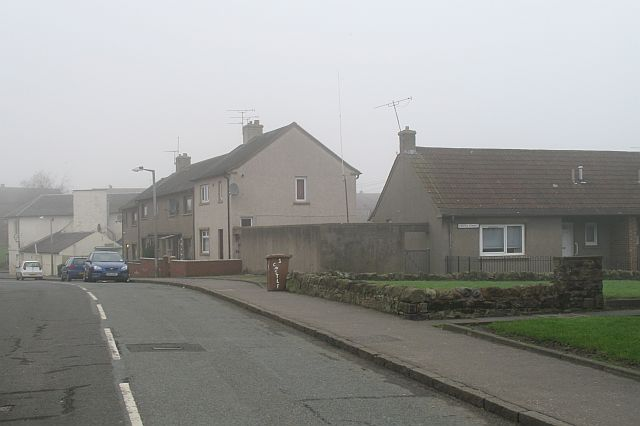
- A wintry day in Ramsay Street/Castle Street of Coalsnaughton, February 2008

- Location within Clackmannanshire
- Population: 1,290 (2020)
- OS grid reference: NS919956
- Council area: Clackmannanshire
- Lieutenancy area: Clackmannanshire
- Country: Scotland
- Sovereign state: United Kingdom
- Post town: Tillicoultry
- Postcode district: FK13
- Dialling code: 01259
- Police: Scotland
- Fire: Scottish
- Ambulance: Scottish
- UK Parliament: Alloa and Grangemouth
- Scottish Parliament: Clackmannanshire and Dunblane

Coalsnaughton or Calabar (from Scottish Gaelic: Cois Neachdain, lit. 'at the foot of Nechtan('s land)') is a village in Clackmannanshire, Scotland. It is just south of Tillicoultry, in whose parish the village lies. The miners' row was built by Robert Bald. The name was recorded as Cosnachtan in 1492 and is probably named after Nechtan mac Der-Ilei, a Pictish king. As a result of the mining industry in the town, the first syllable was interpreted as "Coals". This was then re-interpreted by some Gaelic speakers as having come from Gaelic caolas "strait".

== 2026 evacuation ==
In May 2026, 97 houses in the village were evacuated at short notice due to unexplained earth movement, above a disused, shallow, late 19th-century coal mine. Engineers subsequently determined that the ground was moving as much as 20 millimetres (0.79 in) per day.

On 27 August 2026, the Mining Remediation Authority decided to demolish 60 affected properties on two streets, Benbuck View and Dunmoss View.
