= Fishcross =

Coordinates: 56.137°N 3.771°W

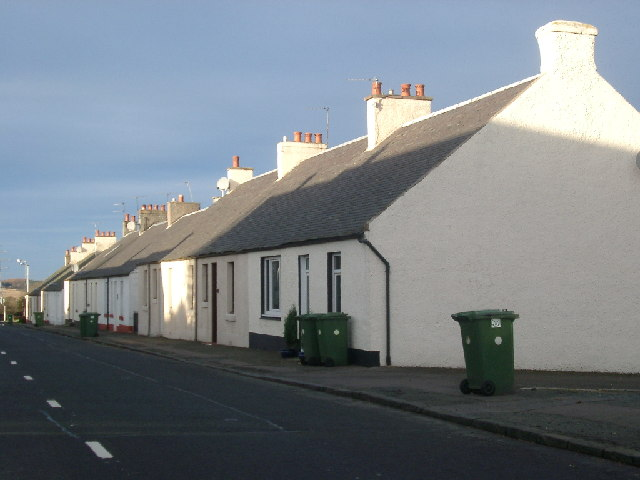
- Fishcross

- Location within Clackmannanshire
- OS grid reference: NS901952
- Council area: Clackmannanshire
- Lieutenancy area: Clackmannanshire
- Country: Scotland
- Sovereign state: United Kingdom
- Post town: ALLOA
- Postcode district: FK10
- Dialling code: 01259
- Police: Scotland
- Fire: Scottish
- Ambulance: Scottish
- UK Parliament: Alloa and Grangemouth
- Scottish Parliament: Clackmannanshire and Dunblane

Fishcross is a small village in Clackmannanshire in central Scotland, situated to the north of Sauchie at a crossroads just south of Tillicoultry. Formerly a mining village, the population is 484 as at 2003.

A golf course and equestrian centre are located nearby and at Auchinbaird there is a fine example of a windmill built in the early 18th Century to drain a coal pit and later converted to serve as a dovecote.
