= 2012 Clackmannanshire Council election =

2012 Scottish local government election

← 2007	3 May 2012	2017 →

All 18 seats to Clackmannanshire Council 10 seats needed for a majority
	First party	Second party	Third party
Leader	Gary Womersley	Robert McGill	Alastair Campbell
Party	SNP	Labour	Conservative
Leader's seat	Clackmannanshire Central	Clackmannanshire North	Clackmannanshire East
Last election	7 seats, 38.9%	8 seats, 44.4%	1 seat, 5.6%
Seats before	8	7	1
Seats won	8	8	1
Seat change	0	▲1	0
	Fourth party	Fifth party
Leader	Archie Drummond	John Shier Biggam
Party	Independent	Liberal Democrats
Leader's seat	Clackmannanshire North	Clackmannanshire North defeated
Last election	1 seat, 5.6%	1 seat, 5.6%
Seats before	1	1
Seats won	1	0
Seat change	0	▼1
Council Leader before election
Gary Womersley
SNP
Council Leader after election
Gary Womersley
SNP

Elections to Clackmannanshire Council were held on 3 May 2012, the same day as the 31 other local authorities in Scotland. The election used the five wards created under the Local Governance (Scotland) Act 2004, with 18 Councillors being elected. Each ward elected either 3 or 4 members, using the STV electoral system.

The election saw the Scottish National Party gain a seat and increase their vote share on the council to have the same number of seats as Labour. The Scottish Conservative and Unionist Party retained their single seat on the council and there remains a single Independent. The Scottish Liberal Democrats were wiped out losing their single seat.

After the election an SNP minority administration was formed with the support of the Independent Councillor. The Conservatives abstained on the vote.

== Election result ==
Clackmannanshire local election result 2012
Party	Seats	Gains	Losses	Net gain/loss	Seats %	Votes %	Votes	+/−
SNP	8	0	0	0	44.44	46.05	6,963	+7.95
Labour	8	1	0	+1	44.44	38.12	5,764	+0.32
Conservative	1	0	0	0	5.56	9.88	1,494	-0.92
Independent	1	1	1	0	5.56	5.05	764	-1.85
Liberal Democrats	0	0	1	-1	0.00	0.89	136	-4.31

Note: "Votes" are the first preference votes. The net gain/loss and percentage changes relate to the result of the previous Scottish local elections on 3 May 2007. This may differ from other published sources showing gain/loss relative to seats held at dissolution of Scotland's councils.

== Ward results ==
=== Clackmannanshire West ===
- 2007: 2xLab; 2xSNP
- 2012: 2xLab; 2xSNP
- 2007-2012 Change: No change

Clackmannanshire West – 4 seats
Party	Candidate	FPv%	Count						
Party	Candidate	FPv%	1	2	3	4	5	6	7
Labour	George Matchett (incumbent)	32.37%	1,037						
SNP	Tina Murphy (incumbent)	21.63%	693						
Labour	Jim Stalker	14.76%	473	781.2					
SNP	Les Sharp	12.58%	403	409.7	416.9	422.9	443.1	474.5	767.1
SNP	Janis Paterson (incumbent)	7.21%	231	247.4	260.9	298.2	325.3	362.4	
Conservative	Bill Mason	7.21%	231	236.3	249.8	250.8	293.6		
Independent	Eddie Carrick (incumbent)	4.24%	136	147.1	168.2	170.8			
Electorate: 7,807 Valid: 3,204 Spoilt: 58 Quota: 641 Turnout: 3,262 (41.04%)

=== Clackmannanshire North ===
- 2007: 2xSNP; 1xLab; 1xLib Dem
- 2012: 2xSNP; 1xLab; 1xIndependent
- 2007-2012 Change: Independent gain one seat from Lib Dem

Clackmannanshire North – 4 seats
Party	Candidate	FPv%	Count							
Party	Candidate	FPv%	1	2	3	4	5	6	7	8
SNP	Donald Balsillie (incumbent)	20.09%	728							
Labour	Robert McGill (incumbent)	18.3%	663	663.1	669.1	684.1	1,001.1			
SNP	Walter McAdam (incumbent)	15.02%	544	545.8	559.8	568.8	573.8	600.9	603.9	1,055.4
Independent	Archie Drummond†	14.90%	540	540.1	587.2	664.2	683.2	743.3		
SNP	May Atkinson	13.91%	504	506.7	525.7	535.7	546.7	567	570	
Labour	Jacqueline McKay	9.69%	351	351	366	377				
Conservative	Chris Dixon	4.33%	157	157	173					
Liberal Democrats	John Shier Biggam (incumbent)	3.75%	136	136.1						
Electorate: - Valid: 3,623 Spoilt: 102 Quota: 725 Turnout: 3,725 (%)

=== Clackmannanshire Central ===
- 2007: 2xLab; 1xSNP
- 2012: 2xLab; 1xSNP
- 2007-2012 Change: No change

Clackmannanshire Central – 3 seats
Party	Candidate	FPv%	Count					
Party	Candidate	FPv%	1	2	3	4	5	6
Labour	Derek Stewart (incumbent)	37.37%	916					
SNP	Gary Womersley (incumbent)	26.97%	661					
SNP	Gaynor Hamilton	17.18%	421	438.5	479.5	493.8	522.7	
Labour	Graham Watt	11.75%	288	547.7	549.7	556.4	583.1	751.9
Independent	Brian Gerard Doyle	3.59%	88	91.9	92.9	118.3		
Conservative	Kate Mason	3.14%	77	80.6	80.1			
Electorate: - Valid: 2,451 Spoilt: 55 Quota: 613 Turnout: 2,506 (%)

=== Clackmannanshire South ===
- 2007: 2xLab; 1xIndependent; 1xSNP
- 2012: 2xSNP; 2xLab
- 2007-2012 Change: SNP gain from Independent

Clackmannanshire South – 4 seats
Party	Candidate	FPv%	Count		
Party	Candidate	FPv%	1	2	3
SNP	Craig Holden (incumbent)	32.15%	1,042		
Labour	Janet Kerr Cadenhead (incumbent)	24.50%	794		
SNP	Ellen Forson	21.47%	696		
Labour	Kenneth Earle (incumbent)	15.33%	497	604.7	731.4
Conservative	Alan Jamieson	6.54%	212	261.7	263.4
Electorate: - Valid: 3,241 Spoilt: 99 Quota: 649 Turnout: 3,340 (%)

=== Clackmannanshire East ===
- 2007: 1xCon; 1xLab; 1xSNP
- 2012: 1xCon; 1xSNP; 1xLab
- 2007-2012 Change: No change

Clackmannanshire East – 3 seats
Party	Candidate	FPv%	Count
Party	Candidate	FPv%	1
Conservative	Alastair Campbell (incumbent)	31.40%	817
SNP	Irene Hamilton (incumbent)	30.01%	781
Labour	Kathleen Martin	28.63%	745
SNP	Helen Lewis	9.95%	259
Electorate: - Valid: 2,602 Spoilt: 32 Quota: 651 Turnout: 2,634 (%)

== Changes since 2012 ==
† On 11 September 2016, Clackmannanshire North Cllr Archie Drummond joined the SNP and ceased to be an Independent.
