= 2022 Clackmannanshire Council election =

Clackmannanshire Council election

- 5 May 2022

All 18 seats to Clackmannanshire Council 10 seats needed for a majority
- Registered: 40,241
- Turnout: 43.8%
	First party	Second party
	SNP	Lab
Leader	Ellen Forson	Kenny Earle
Party	SNP	Labour
Leader's seat	Clackmannanshire South	Clackmannanshire South
Last election	8 seats, 37.1%	5 seats, 27.8%
Seats before	8	5
Seats won	9	5
Seat change	▲1	Steady
Popular vote	6,765	4,091
Percentage	39.4%	23.8%
Swing	▲2.3%	▼4.0%
	Third party	Fourth party
	Con	Grn
Leader		Bryan Quinn
Party	Conservative	Green
Leader's seat		Clackmannanshire South
Last election	5 seats, 24.9%	0 seats, 6.5%
Seats before	4	0
Seats won	3	1
Seat change	▼2	▲1
Popular vote	3,996	1,438
Percentage	23.2%	8.4%
Swing	▼1.4%	▲1.9%
- Results of the 2022 Clackmannanshire Council Election by wards.

Leader before election
Ellen Forson
(SNP)
No overall control
Leader after election
Ellen Forson
(SNP)
No overall control

Elections to Clackmannanshire Council took place on 5 May 2022, the same day as the 31 other Scottish local government elections. As with other Scottish council elections, it was held using single transferable vote (STV)—a form of proportional representation—in which multiple candidates are elected in each ward and voters rank candidates in order of preference.

For the third consecutive election, the Scottish National Party (SNP) were returned as the largest party with nine seats, but remained shy of an overall majority. Labour gained back some of the ground they had lost at the previous election and were again returned as the second-largest party with five seats. The Conservatives lost 40 per cent of their seats to return three councillors, while the Greens won their first seat in a Clackmannanshire election.

The minority SNP administration retained control of the council with incumbent council leader Cllr Ellen Forson re-elected to the post. Cllr Donald Balsillie was elected Provost and Cllr Phil Fairlie was selected as the council's first convener.

== Background ==
=== Previous election ===
At the previous election in 2017, the Scottish National Party (SNP) again won the most seats and governed with a minority administration, having returned eight councillors. Labour experienced heavy losses as their number fell from eight to five; they became the second largest party. The Conservatives made a net gain of four to hold five seats.

2017 Clackmannanshire Council election result
Party	Seats	Vote share
SNP	8	37.1%
Labour	5	27.8%
Conservatives	5	24.9%

=== Electoral system ===
The election used the five wards created under the Local Governance (Scotland) Act 2004, with 18 councillors being elected. Each ward elected either 3 or 4 members, using the single transferable vote (STV)—a form of proportional representation—electoral system where candidates are ranked in order of preference.

=== Composition ===
The only change to the composition of the council came in March 2018 when Conservative councillor Chris Dixon resigned from the party and sat as an independent. Three by-elections were held and resulted in two SNP holds and a Conservative hold.

Composition of Clackmannanshire Council
Party	2017 election	Dissolution
SNP	8	8
Labour	5	5
Conservative	5	4
Independent	0	1

=== Retiring councillors ===
Retiring councillors
Ward	Party	Retiring councillor
Clackmannanshire West	Labour	George Matchett
Clackmannanshire West	SNP	Tina Murphy
Clackmannanshire West	SNP	Les Sharp
Clackmannanshire North	Labour	Dave Clark
Clackmannanshire North	SNP	Helen Lewis
Clackmannanshire Central	Labour	Derek Stewart
Clackmannanshire Central	Conservative	Mike Watson
Clackmannanshire South	Independent	Chris Dixon
Clackmannanshire East	SNP	Graham Lindsay

=== Candidates ===
The total number of candidates increased from 35 in 2017 to 36. The SNP again stood the most candidates at nine. However, this was two less than they had fielded in 2017. Similarly, the number of Labour candidates was less than 2017, with eight candidates standing across the five wards—one fewer than 2017. The Conservatives stood six candidates—up one from 2017—while the Greens also contested every ward, standing five candidates—the same number as they had in 2017. The number of Liberal Democrats standing (three) was one fewer than in 2017 and the number of independent candidates (three) increased by two. For the first time, the Alba Party contested an election in Clackmannanshire, standing two candidates.

== Result ==
2022 Clackmannanshire Council election result
Party	Seats	Gains	Losses	Net gain/loss	Seats %	Votes %	Votes	+/−
SNP	9	1	0	▲1	50.0	39.4	6,765	▲2.3
Labour	5	0	0	Steady	27.8	23.8	4,091	▼4.0
Conservative	3	0	2	▼2	16.7	23.2	3,996	▼1.7
Green	1	1	0	▲1	5.6	8.4	1,438	▲1.9
Independent	0	0	0	Steady	0.0	2.5	423	▲2.1
Liberal Democrats	0	0	0	Steady	0.0	2.0	350	▼1.1
Alba	0	0	0	Steady	0.0	0.7	128	New
Total	18						17,191	

Note: Votes are the sum of first preference votes across all council wards. The net gain/loss and percentage changes relate to the result of the previous Scottish local elections on 4 May 2017. This is because STV has an element of proportionality which is not present unless multiple seats are being elected. This may differ from other published sources showing gain/loss relative to seats held at the dissolution of Scotland's councils.

=== Ward summary ===
Results of the 2022 Clackmannanshire Council election by ward
Ward	%	Cllrs	%	Cllrs	%	Cllrs	%	Cllrs	%	Cllrs	Total Cllrs
Ward	SNP		Lab		Con		Green		Others		Total Cllrs
Clackmannanshire West	43.6	2	26.8	1	22.8	1	4.0	0	2.7	0	4
Clackmannanshire North	41.4	2	18.7	1	21.9	1	5.7	0	12.3	0	4
Clackmannanshire Central	43.5	2	34.7	1	17.3	0	4.5	0			3
Clackmannanshire South	37.9	2	23.1	1	16.5	0	19.5	1	3.0	0	4
Clackmannanshire East	30.8	1	19.6	1	37.3	1	6.3	0	6.0	0	3
Total	39.4	9	23.8	5	23.2	3	8.4	1	5.2	0	18

=== Seats changing hands ===
Below is a list of seats which elected a different party or parties from 2017 in order to highlight the change in the political composition of the council from the previous election. The list does not include defeated incumbents who resigned or defected from their party and subsequently failed re-election while the party held the seat.

Seats changing hands
Seat	2017		2022	
Seat	Party	Member	Party	Member
Clackmannanshire Central	Conservative	Mike Watson	SNP	Jane McTaggart
Clackmannanshire South	Conservative	Chris Dixon	Green	Bryan Quinn

Notes

1. In 2017, Chris Dixon was elected as a Conservative candidate but later resigned from the party.

== Ward results ==
=== Clackmannanshire West ===
The SNP (2), Conservatives (1) and Labour (1) retained the seats they had won at the previous election.

Clackmannanshire West - 4 seats
Party	Candidate	FPv%	Count	
Party	Candidate	FPv%	1	2
SNP	Phil Fairlie	24.0	875	
Conservative	Darren Lee	22.8	830	
Labour	Mark McLuckie	21.6	787	
SNP	Graham Lindsay	19.6	715	844
Labour	Daniel Rooney	5.2	190	192
Green	Cara Quinn	4.0	147	153
Liberal Democrats	Laura Quin	2.7	99	101
Electorate: 8,936 Valid: 3,643 Spoilt: 111 Quota: 729 Turnout: 42.0%

=== Clackmannanshire North ===
The SNP (2), Conservatives (1) and Labour (1) retained the seats they had won at the previous election.

Clackmannanshire North - 4 seats
Party	Candidate	FPv%	Count					
Party	Candidate	FPv%	1	2	3	4	5	6
SNP	Donald Balsillie	26.4	1,062					
Conservative	Martha Benny	21.9	884					
Labour	William Keogh	18.7	754	764	784	790	795	852
SNP	Fiona Law	15.0	605	799	800	848		
Independent	Ian Millar	7.0	280	285	297	309	314	345
Green	Clare Andrews	5.7	231	253	256	269	287	326
Liberal Democrats	Gordon Bruce	3.2	128	132	148	148	150	
Alba	Eva Comrie	2.1	84	93	95			
Electorate: 8,643 Valid: 4,028 Spoilt: 111 Quota: 806 Turnout: 47.9%

=== Clackmannanshire Central ===
The SNP and Labour retained the seats they had won at the previous election while the SNP also gained one seat from the Conservatives.

Clackmannanshire Central - 3 seats
Party	Candidate	FPv%	Count						
Party	Candidate	FPv%	1	2	3	4	5	6	7
SNP	Wendy Hamilton	30.4	730						
Conservative	Kate Mason	17.3	416	417	426	437	455	476	
Labour	Carolynne Hunter	13.3	320	324	332	370			
SNP	Jane McTaggart	13.1	314	419	472	481	506	519	584
Labour	Janine Rennie	12.0	288	291	305	469	757		
Labour	Huw Sherrard	9.4	225	227	234				
Green	John Hosie	4.5	109	119					
Electorate: 6,301 Valid: 2,402 Spoilt: 95 Quota: 601 Turnout: 39.6%

=== Clackmannanshire South ===
The SNP (2) and Labour (1) retained the seats they had won at the previous election while the Greens gained a seat from the Conservatives.

Clackmannanshire South - 4 seats
Party	Candidate	FPv%	Count						
Party	Candidate	FPv%	1	2	3	4	5	6	7
Labour	Kenneth Earle	23.1	877						
SNP	Ellen Forson	21.0	800						
Green	Bryan Quinn	19.5	742	768					
SNP	Craig Holden	16.9	643	662	697	701	720	747	800
Conservative	William Marlin	16.5	629	653	653	654	658	688	
Independent	Hugh van Lierop	1.8	68	77	78	79	92		
Alba	Matthew Reilly	1.2	44	47	47	47			
Electorate: 9,357 Valid: 3,803 Spoilt: 100 Quota: 761 Turnout: 41.7%

=== Clackmannanshire East ===
The SNP, Conservatives and Labour retained the seats they had won at the previous election.

Clackmannanshire East - 3 seats
Party	Candidate	FPv%	Count					
Party	Candidate	FPv%	1	2	3	4	5	6
SNP	Scott Harrison	30.8	1,021					
Conservative	Denis Coyne	30.4	1,008					
Labour	Kathleen Martin	19.6	650	685	692	709	760	951
Conservative	Neil Gault	6.9	229	232	384	405	417	435
Green	Marion Robertson	6.3	209	302	305	323	377	
Liberal Democrats	Angus Myles	3.7	123	136	140	153		
Independent	Les Calderwood	2.3	75	82	85			
Electorate: 7,004 Valid: 3,315 Spoilt: 46 Quota: 829 Turnout: 48.0%

== Aftermath ==
Incumbent council leader Ellen Forson said the result was "a vindication of all the hard work" the SNP administrations had done over the past decade. The party again formed a minority administration with Cllr Forson re-elected as council leader and Cllr Graham Lindsay elected as depute leader. The role of Provost was split following the creation of the convener post. The Provost would remain a ceremonial post, with the convener taking on the administrative responsibilities. Cllr Phil Fairlie was elected as the council's first convener, with Cllr Donald Balsillie elected as Provost. Cllr Craig Holden took on the roles of deputy convener and deputy Provost.

Following the election, the leadership of the Labour group changed. Cllr Kenny Earle and Cllr Kathleen Martin stood down as leader and deputy leader respectively. Cllr Janine Rennie was selected to replace Earle as leader while Cllr Mark McLuckie was chosen as deputy leader.

In December 2022, Clackmannanshire South councillor Craig Holden resigned from the SNP group citing a difference of opinions and became an independent. He had previously represented the ward as an independent councillor between 2007 and 2012. Cllr Holden was replaced as deputy Provost by Cllr Jane McTaggart and as deputy convener by Cllr Balsillie in February 2023.
