= 2007 Clackmannanshire Council election =

2007 Scottish local government election

2007 Clackmannanshire election
| ← 2003 | 3 May 2007 | 2012 → |

All 18 seats to Clackmannanshire Council 10 seats needed for a majority

Elections to Clackmannanshire Council were held on 3 May 2007, the same day as the other Scottish local government elections and the Scottish Parliament general election. The election was the first one using 5 new wards created as a result of the Local Governance (Scotland) Act 2004, each ward will elect three or four councillors using the single transferable vote system form of proportional representation. The new wards replace 18 single-member wards which used the plurality (first past the post) system of election.

== Election results ==
The votes and percentage of vote share are based on first preference votes.

Clackmannanshire local election result 2007
| Party | Seats | Gains | Losses | Net gain/loss | Seats % | Votes % | Votes | +/− |
|---|---|---|---|---|---|---|---|---|
| Labour | 8 | N/A | N/A | –2 | 44.4 | 37.8 | 7,625 | |
| SNP | 7 | N/A | N/A | +1 | 38.9 | 38.1 | 7,680 | |
| Conservative | 1 | N/A | N/A | ±0 | 5.6 | 10.8 | 2,176 | |
| Liberal Democrats | 1 | N/A | N/A | +1 | 5.6 | 5.2 | 1,040 | |
| Scottish Senior Citizens | 0 | N/A | N/A | ±0 | 0.0 | 0.8 | 166 | |
| Scottish Socialist | 0 | N/A | N/A | ±0 | 0.0 | 0.4 | 75 | |
| Independent | 1 | N/A | N/A | ±0 | 5.6 | 6.9 | 1,395 | |

== Ward results ==
2007 Council election: Clackmannanshire West
| Party | Candidate | FPv% | % | Seat | Count |
|---|---|---|---|---|---|
| Labour | George Matchett | 1,094 | 25.6 | 1 | 1 |
| SNP | Tina Murphy | 1,027 | 24.0 | 2 | 1 |
| Labour | Eddie Carrick† | 824 | 19.3 | 3 | 2 |
| SNP | Janis Paterson | 652 | 15.3 | 4 | 5 |
| Conservative | Bill Mason | 369 | 8.6 | | |
| Liberal Democrats | Iftikhar Ahmed | 309 | 7.2 | | |

2007 Council election: Clackmannanshire North
| Party | Candidate | FPv% | % | Seat | Count |
|---|---|---|---|---|---|
| SNP | Donald Balsillie | 1,256 | 26.0 | 1 | 1 |
| Labour | Robert McGill | 1,099 | 22.8 | 2 | 1 |
| SNP | Walter McAdam | 950 | 19.7 | 3 | 2 |
| Labour | Jacqueline McKay | 374 | 7.7 | | |
| Conservative | Kate Mason | 333 | 6.9 | | |
| Liberal Democrats | John Shier Biggam | 322 | 6.7 | 4 | 9 |
| SNP | Helen McGregor | 256 | 5.3 | | |
| Scottish Senior Citizens | Ralph Harness | 166 | 3.4 | | |
| Scottish Socialist | Iain Campbell | 75 | 1.6 | | |

2007 Council election: Clackmannanshire Central
| Party | Candidate | FPv% | % | Seat | Count |
|---|---|---|---|---|---|
| Labour | Derek Stewart | 1,089 | 35.1 | 1 | 1 |
| Labour | Samuel Bryce Ovens | 688 | 22.2 | 2 | 2 |
| SNP | Gary Womersley | 620 | 20.0 | 3 | 5 |
| SNP | Sandy Pollock | 518 | 16.7 | | |
| Conservative | George Murray | 190 | 6.1 | | |

2007 Council election: Clackmannanshire South
| Party | Candidate | FPv% | % | Seat | Count |
|---|---|---|---|---|---|
| Independent | Craig Holden†† | 1,168 | 26.2 | 1 | 1 |
| Labour | Janet Kerr Cadenhead | 936 | 21.0 | 2 | 1 |
| SNP | Mark English | 797 | 17.9 | 3 | 5 |
| Labour | Kenneth Earle | 570 | 12.8 | 4 | 7 |
| SNP | Mike Hutchison | 515 | 11.6 | | |
| Conservative | Alan Jamieson | 244 | 5.5 | | |
| Independent | James Alexander Mackie | 227 | 5.1 | | |

2007 Council election: Clackmannanshire East
| Party | Candidate | FPv% | % | Seat | Count |
|---|---|---|---|---|---|
| Conservative | Alastair Campbell | 1,040 | 29.8 | 1 | 1 |
| Labour | Henry McLaren | 951 | 27.3 | 2 | 1 |
| SNP | Irene Hamilton | 669 | 19.2 | 3 | 4 |
| SNP | Alison Lindsay | 420 | 12.0 | | |
| Liberal Democrats | Charles Bell | 409 | 11.7 | | |

== Changes since 2007 Election ==
- †On 15 December 2011, Clackmannanshire West Cllr Eddie Carrick resigned from the Labour Party and is now an Independent.
- ††On 14 March 2012, Clackmannanshire South Cllr Craig Holden joined the Scottish National Party and ceased to be an Independent.
