= 1995 Clackmannanshire Council election =

1995 Scottish local government election

The 1995 Clackmannanshire Council election was held on 6 April 1995, the same day as the other Scottish local government elections.

== Results ==
1995 Clackmannanshire Council election result
Party	Seats	Gains	Losses	Net gain/loss	Seats %	Votes %	Votes	+/−
Labour	8	-	-	Steady	66.7	54.1	9,315	▲12.9
SNP	3	-	-	Steady	25.0	38.5	6,628	▲0.1
Conservative	1	-	-	Steady	8.3	3.0	508	▼15.2
Liberal Democrats	0	-	-	Steady	0.0	3.9	667	▲1.5
Independent	0	-	-	Steady	0.0	0.6	96	New
