= Clackmannanshire West =

Electoral ward in Scotland

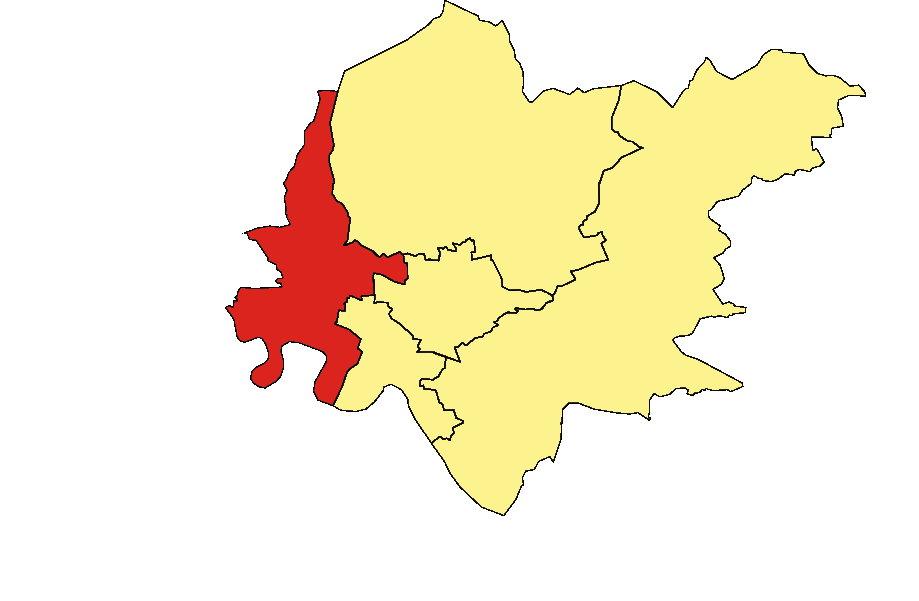
Location of the ward

Clackmannanshire West is one of the five wards used to elect members of the Clackmannanshire council. It elects four Councillors.

== Councillors ==
Election	Councillors			
2007	Tina Murphy (SNP)	Janis Paterson (SNP)	Eddie Carrick (Labour /Ind.)	George Matchett (Labour)
2011	Tina Murphy (SNP)	Janis Paterson (SNP)	Eddie Carrick (Labour /Ind.)	George Matchett (Labour)
2012	Tina Murphy (SNP)	Les Sharp (SNP)	Jim Sralker (Labour)	George Matchett (Labour)
2017	Tina Murphy (SNP)	Les Sharp (SNP)	Darren Lee (Conservative)	George Matchett (Labour)
2022	Phil Fairlie (SNP)	Graham Lindsay (SNP)	Darren Lee (Conservative)	Mark McLuckie (Labour)

== Election results ==
=== 2022 election ===
Clackmannanshire West - 4 seats
Party	Candidate	FPv%	Count	
Party	Candidate	FPv%	1	2
SNP	Phil Fairlie	24.0	875	
Conservative	Darren Lee	22.8	830	
Labour	Mark McLuckie	21.6	787	
SNP	Graham Lindsay	19.6	715	844
Labour	Daniel Rooney	5.2	190	192
Green	Cara Quinn	4.0	147	153
Liberal Democrats	Laura Quin	2.7	99	101
Electorate: 8,936 Valid: 3,643 Spoilt: 111 Quota: 729 Turnout: 42.0%

=== 2017 election ===
2017 Clackmannanshire Council election

Clackmannanshire West - 4 seats
Party	Candidate	FPv%	Count						
Party	Candidate	FPv%	1	2	3	4	5	6	7
Conservative	Darren Lee	21.4	808						
Labour	George Matchett (incumbent)	19.9	753	763.4					
SNP	Tina Margaret Murphy (incumbent)	18.6	704	705.5	705.9	717.9	722.3	766.5	
SNP	Les Sharp (incumbent)	17.8	675	675.9	676	680.1	701.2	751.5	761.4
Labour	Craig Miller	12.6	478	482.2	488.7	505.2	541.7	590.6	591.2
Green	Cara Quinn	4.2	159	161.4	161.6	177.4	215.9		
Liberal Democrats	Jim Hay	2.9	112	122.6	122.8	142.9			
Independent	Thomas Joshua Harrison	2.2	85	91.4	91.5				
Electorate: 8,726 Valid: 3,774 Spoilt: 97 Quota: 755 Turnout: 3,871 (44.36%)

=== 2012 election ===
2012 Clackmannanshire Council election

Clackmannanshire West - 4 seats
Party	Candidate	FPv%	Count						
Party	Candidate	FPv%	1	2	3	4	5	6	7
Labour	George Matchett (incumbent)	32.37%	1,037						
SNP	Tina Murphy (incumbent)	21.63%	693						
Labour	Jim Stalker	14.76%	473	781.2					
SNP	Les Sharp	12.58%	403	409.7	416.9	422.9	443.1	474.5	767.1
SNP	Janis Paterson (incumbent)	7.21%	231	247.4	260.9	298.2	325.3	362.4	
Conservative	Bill Mason	7.21%	231	236.3	249.8	250.8	293.6		
Independent	Eddie Carrick (incumbent)	4.24%	136	147.1	168.2	170.8			
Electorate: 7,807 Valid: 3,204 Spoilt: 58 Quota: 641 Turnout: 3,262 (41.04%)

=== 2007 election ===
2007 Clackmannanshire Council election

2007 Council election: Clackmannanshire West
Party	Candidate	FPv%	%	Seat	Count
Labour	George Matchett	1,094	25.6	1	1
SNP	Tina Murphy	1,027	24.0	2	1
Labour	Eddie Carrick†	824	19.3	3	2
SNP	Janis Paterson	652	15.3	4	5
Conservative	Bill Mason	369	8.6		
Liberal Democrats	Iftikhar Ahmed	309	7.2		
