= 2017 Clackmannanshire Council election =

2017 Scottish local government election

- 4 May 2017

All 18 seats to Clackmannanshire Council 10 seats needed for a majority
	First party	Second party	Third party
Leader	Les Sharp	Dave Clark	Bill Mason
Party	SNP	Labour	Conservative
Leader's seat	Clackmannanshire West	Clackmannanshire North	Clackmannanshire East
Last election	8 seats, 46.1%	8 seats, 38.1%	1 seat, 9.9%
Seats before	8	8	1
Seats won	8	5	5
Seat change	Steady	▼3	▲4
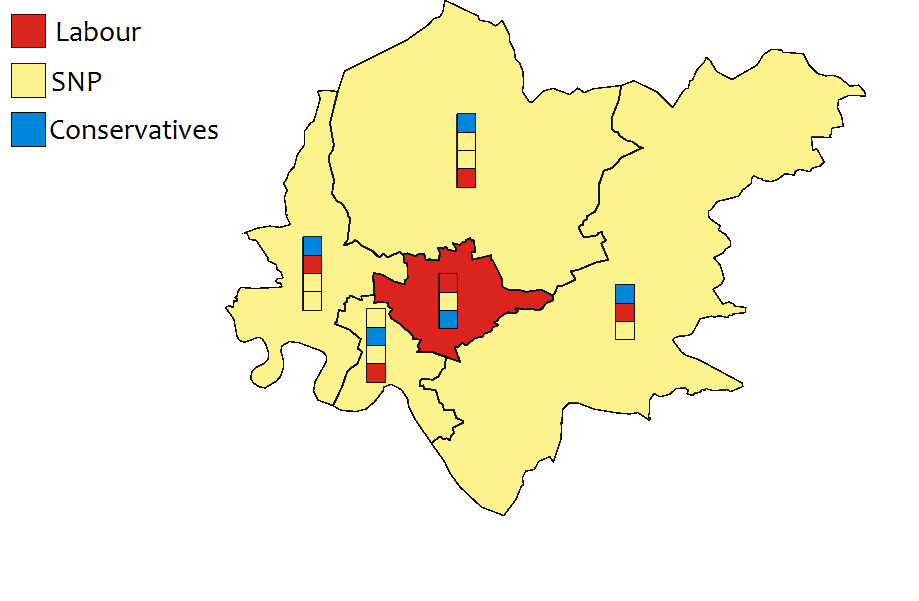
- The 5 multi-member ward. (Colour of ward represents the political party that received most votes in that ward)
Council Leader before election
Gary Womersley
SNP
Council Leader after election
Les Sharp
SNP

The Clackmannanshire Council election of 2017 was held on 4 May 2017, on the same day as the 31 other local authorities in Scotland. It was the third successive election to run under the STV electoral system and used the five wards created under the Local Governance (Scotland) Act 2004, with 18 councillors being elected.

== Result ==
As Scottish Labour lost three seats and the Scottish National Party held all of theirs, the SNP became the largest party for the first time. The Scottish Conservatives unexpectedly won a seat in every ward, equalling their representation on the council with that of Labour.

During the first meeting of the new council on 18 May, however, an agreement was not reached on how to form an administration. In June 2017 a minority SNP administration was formed.

2017 Clackmannanshire Council election result
Party	Seats	Gains	Losses	Net gain/loss	Seats %	Votes %	Votes	+/−
SNP	8	0	0	0	44.4	37.1	6,525	-8.8
Labour	5	0	3	-3	27.8	27.8	4,887	-10.3
Conservative	5	4	0	+4	27.8	24.9	4,382	+15.1
Green	0	0	0	0	0.0	6.5	1,141	New
Liberal Democrats	0	0	0	0	0.0	3.1	553	+2.3
Independent	0	0	1	-1	0.0	0.5	85	-4.6

Note: "Votes" are the first preference votes. The net gain/loss and percentage changes relate to the result of the previous Scottish local elections on 3 May 2012. This may differ from other published sources showing gain/loss relative to seats held at dissolution of Scotland's councils.

== Ward results ==
=== Clackmannanshire West ===
- 2012-2017 Change: 1 Lab loss and 1 Con gain

Clackmannanshire West – 4 seats
Party	Candidate	FPv%	Count					
Party	Candidate	FPv%	1	2	3	4	5	6
Conservative	Darren Lee	21.4	808					
Labour	George Matchett (incumbent)	19.9	753	763				
SNP	Tina Margaret Murphy (incumbent)	18.6	704	705	705	717	722	766
SNP	Les Sharp (incumbent)	17.8	675	675	676	680	701	751
Labour	Craig Miller	12.6	478	482	488	505	541	590
Green	Cara Quinn	4.2	159	161	161	177	215	
Liberal Democrats	Jim Hay	2.9	112	122	122	142		
Independent	Thomas Joshua Harrison	2.2	85	91	91			
Electorate: 8,726 Valid: 3,774 Spoilt: 97 Quota: 755 Turnout: 3,871 (44.36%)

=== Clackmannanshire North ===
- 2012-2017 Change: 1 Independent loss and 1 Con gain

Clackmannanshire North – 4 seats
Party	Candidate	FPv%	Count				
Party	Candidate	FPv%	1	2	3	4	5
Conservative	Martha Benny	24.0	969				
SNP	Archie Drummond (incumbent)†	16.6	672	675	709	745	909
SNP	Donald Balsille (incumbent)	16.3	660	666	690	711	841
Labour	Dave Clark (incumbent)	15.9	644	678	698	764	773
Labour	Bobby McGill (incumbent)	10.7	432	446	453	507	513
SNP	Helen Lewis	7.2	292	293	313	323	
Liberal Democrats	Damian Sherwood-Johnson	5.1	206	240	283		
Green	Jack Gervaise	3.8	157	167			
Electorate: 8,371 Valid: 4,032 Spoilt: 127 Quota: 807 Turnout: 4,159 (49.68%)

=== Clackmannanshire Central ===
- 2012-2017 Change: 1 Lab Loss; 1 Con Gain

Clackmannanshire Central – 3 seats
Party	Candidate	FPv%	Count				
Party	Candidate	FPv%	1	2	3	4	5
Labour	Derek Stewart (incumbent)	32.8	846				
SNP	Phil Fairlie†††	27.7	714				
Conservative	Mike Watson	16.6	428	443	444	464	550
SNP	Jo Wilkinson	10.5	273	281	337	393	438
Labour	Graham Watt (incumbent)	7.1	183	321	324	356	
Green	John Short	5.1	133	139	143		
Electorate: 6,297 Valid: 2,577 Spoilt: 79 Quota: 645 Turnout: 2,656 (42.18%)

=== Clackmannanshire South ===
- 2012-2017 Change: 1 Con Gain from Lab

Clackmannanshire South – 4 seats
Party	Candidate	FPv%	Count				
Party	Candidate	FPv%	1	2	3	4	5
SNP	Craig Holden (incumbent)	22.4	831				
Conservative	Chris Dixon††	19.6	725	726	759		
SNP	Ellen Forson (incumbent)	17.5	649	716	721	721	730
Labour	Kenneth Earle (incumbent)	17.3	640	644	660	665	817
Green	Bryan Quinn	15.1	560	569	583	587	601
Labour	Christine Sinclair	5.5	205	207	212	214	
Liberal Democrats	John Shier Biggam	2.2	84	84			
Electorate: 8,976 Valid: 3,694 Spoilt: 86 Quota: 739 Turnout: 3,780 (42.11%)

=== Clackmannanshire East ===
- 2012-2017 Change: None

Clackmannanshire East – 3 seats
Party	Candidate	FPv%	Count			
Party	Candidate	FPv%	1	2	3	4
Conservative	Bill Mason††††	41.0	1,452			
Labour	Kathleen Martin (incumbent)	19.9	706	839	868	882
SNP	Graham Lindsay	19.5	692	699	724	1,079
Liberal Democrats	Anne Anderson	4.3	151	345	406	414
SNP	Jane McTaggart	10.3	363	368	390	
Green	Marion Robertson	3.7	132	160		
Electorate: 6,607 Valid: 3,496 Spoilt: 40 Quota: 875 Turnout: 3,536 (53.52%)

== Changes since 2017 ==
- † Clackmannanshire North SNP Cllr Archie Drummond resigned his seat for personal reasons in late December 2017. A by-election was held on 1 March 2018 and the seat was retained by the party's Helen Lewis.
- ††Clackmannanshire South Cllr Chris Dixon on 7 March 2018 resigned from the Scottish Conservative Party on health reasons and now sits as an independent councillor.
- ††† Clackmannanshire Central SNP Cllr Phil Fairlie resigned his seat due to personal and professional reasons. A by-election was held on 18 March 2019. The seat was retained by Jane McTaggart of the SNP.
- †††† Clackmannanshire East Conservative Cllr Bill Mason resigned his seat due to ill-health on 31 December 2019. This by-election was scheduled for 19 March but was deferred due to the COVID-19 pandemic in Scotland until 19 November 2020, when it was retained by Denis Coyne of the Scottish Conservative Party.

== By-elections since 2017 ==
Clackmannanshire North By-election (1 March 2018)
Party	Candidate	FPv%	Count				
Party	Candidate	FPv%	1	2	3	4	5
SNP	Helen Lewis	36.8	769	795	818	980	1,128
Conservative	Alex Stewart	31.5	658	661	693	784	
Labour	Afifa Khanam	23.6	493	513	538		
Liberal Democrats	Damian Sherwood-Johnson	4.0	84	101			
Green	Marion Robertson	3.5	74				
Electorate: 8,457 Valid: 2,078 Spoilt: 14 Quota: 1,040 Turnout: 2,092 (24.7%)

Clackmannanshire Central By-election (28 March 2019)
Party	Candidate	FPv%	Count					
Party	Candidate	FPv%	1	2	3	4	5	6
SNP	Jane McTaggart	40.9	865	872	888	902	933	1,166
Labour	Margaret Brookes	31.9	675	684	696	702	814	
Conservative	William Marlin	19.8	419	423	433	447		
UKIP	Dawson Michie	3.3	69	70	74			
Green	Marion Robertson	2.5	53	60				
Liberal Democrats	John Biggam	1.7	36					
Electorate: 6,184 Valid: 2,117 Spoilt: 29 Quota: 1,059 Turnout: (34.7%)

Clackmannanshire East By-election (19 November 2020)
Party	Candidate	FPv%	Count
Party	Candidate	FPv%	1
Conservative	Denis Coyne	51.2	1,226
SNP	Stephen Leitch	32.0	766
Labour	Carolynne Hunter	8.1	195
Green	Marion Robertson	5.8	139
Liberal Democrats	Jim Hay	2.9	69
Valid: 2,395 Quota: 1,197
