= Clackmannanshire South =

Electoral ward in Scotland

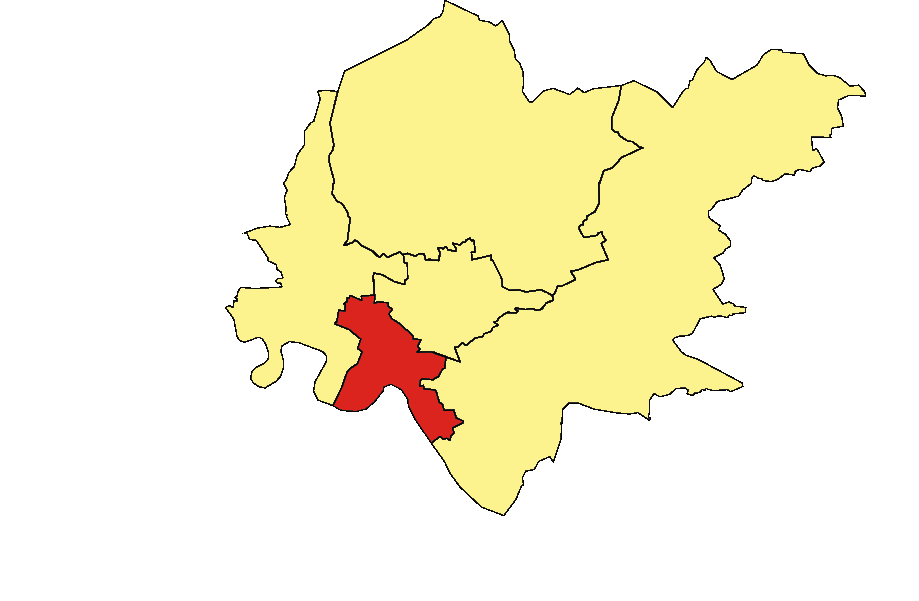
Location of the ward

Clackmannanshire South is one of the five wards used to elect members of the Clackmannanshire council. It elects four Councillors.

== Councillors ==
Election	Councillors			
2007	Mark English (SNP)	Kenneth Earle (Labour)	Janet Kerr Cadenhead (Labour)	Craig Holden (Ind. /SNP/ Ind.)
2012	Ellen Forson (SNP)	Kenneth Earle (Labour)	Janet Kerr Cadenhead (Labour)	Craig Holden (Ind. /SNP/ Ind.)
2017	Ellen Forson (SNP)	Kenneth Earle (Labour)	Chris Dixon (Conservative /Ind.)	Craig Holden (Ind. /SNP/ Ind.)
2018	Ellen Forson (SNP)	Kenneth Earle (Labour)	Chris Dixon (Conservative /Ind.)	Craig Holden (Ind. /SNP/ Ind.)
2022	Ellen Forson (SNP)	Kenneth Earle (Labour)	Bryan Quinn (Greens)	Craig Holden (Ind. /SNP/ Ind.)

== Election results ==
=== 2022 election ===
Clackmannanshire South - 4 seats
Party	Candidate	FPv%	Count						
Party	Candidate	FPv%	1	2	3	4	5	6	7
Labour	Kenneth Earle	23.1	877						
SNP	Ellen Forson	21.0	800						
Green	Bryan Quinn	19.5	742	768					
SNP	Craig Holden	16.9	643	662	697	701	720	747	800
Conservative	William Marlin	16.5	629	653	653	654	658	688	
Independent	Hugh van Lierop	1.8	68	77	78	79	92		
Alba	Matthew Reilly	1.2	44	47	47	47			
Electorate: 9,357 Valid: 3,803 Spoilt: 100 Quota: 761 Turnout: 41.7%

=== 2017 election ===
2017 Clackmannanshire Council election

Clackmannanshire South - 4 seats
Party	Candidate	FPv%	Count						
Party	Candidate	FPv%	1	2	3	4	5	6	7
SNP	Craig Holden (incumbent)	22.4	831						
Conservative	Chris Dixon††	19.6	725	726.3	759.4				
SNP	Ellen Forson (incumbent)	17.5	649	716.9	721	721.6	730	737	1000.2
Labour	Kenneth Earle (incumbent)	17.3	640	644	665.2	817.8			
Green	Bryan Quinn	15.1	560	569.5	583.5	587	601.8	621.3	
Labour	Christine Sinclair	5.5	205	207.1	212.2	214.2			
Liberal Democrats	John Shier Biggam	2.2	84	84.3					
Electorate: 8,976 Valid: 3,694 Spoilt: 86 Quota: 739 Turnout: 3,780 (42.11%)

=== 2012 election ===
2012 Clackmannanshire Council election

Clackmannanshire South - 4 seats
Party	Candidate	FPv%	Count		
Party	Candidate	FPv%	1	2	3
SNP	Craig Holden (incumbent)	32.15%	1,042		
Labour	Janet Kerr Cadenhead (incumbent)	24.50%	794		
SNP	Ellen Forson	21.47%	696		
Labour	Kenneth Earle (incumbent)	15.33%	497	604.7	731.4
Conservative	Alan Jamieson	6.54%	212	261.7	263.4
Electorate: - Valid: 3,241 Spoilt: 99 Quota: 649 Turnout: 3,340 (%)

=== 2007 election ===
2007 Clackmannanshire Council election

2007 Council election: Clackmannanshire South
Party	Candidate	FPv%	%	Seat	Count
Independent	Craig Holden††	1,168	26.2	1	1
Labour	Janet Kerr Cadenhead	936	21.0	2	1
SNP	Mark English	797	17.9	3	5
Labour	Kenneth Earle	570	12.8	4	7
SNP	Mike Hutchison	515	11.6		
Conservative	Alan Jamieson	244	5.5		
Independent	James Alexander Mackie	227	5.1		
