= Clackmannanshire North =

Electoral ward in Scotland

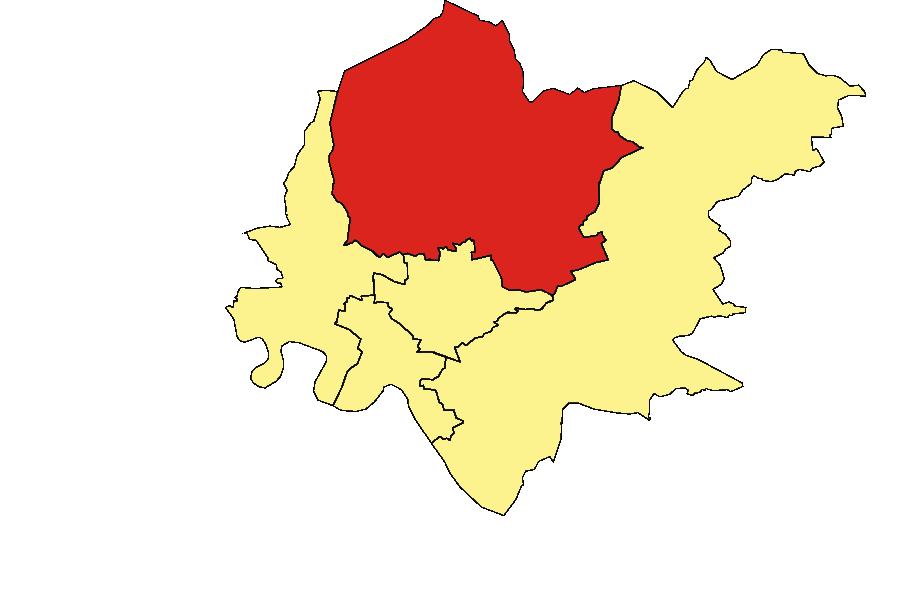
Location of the ward

Clackmannanshire North is one of the five wards used to elect members of the Clackmannanshire council. It elects four Councillors.

== Councillors ==
Election	Councillors			
2007	Donald Balsillie (SNP)	Walter McAdam (SNP)	Robert McGill (Labour)	John Shier Biggam (Liberal Democrats)
2012	Donald Balsillie (SNP)	Walter McAdam (SNP)	Robert McGill (Labour)	Archie Drummond (Ind./ SNP)
2017	Donald Balsillie (SNP)	Martha Benny (Conservative)	Dave Clark (Labour)	Archie Drummond (Ind./ SNP)
2018	Donald Balsillie (SNP)	Martha Benny (Conservative)	Dave Clark (Labour)	Helen Lewis (SNP)
2022	Donald Balsillie (SNP)	Martha Benny (Conservative)	William Keogh (Labour)	Fiona Law (SNP)

== Election results ==
=== 2022 election ===
Clackmannanshire North - 4 seats
Party	Candidate	FPv%	Count					
Party	Candidate	FPv%	1	2	3	4	5	6
SNP	Donald Balsillie	26.4	1,062					
Conservative	Martha Benny	21.9	884					
Labour	William Keogh	18.7	754	764	784	790	795	852
SNP	Fiona Law	15.0	605	799	800	848		
Independent	Ian Millar	7.0	280	285	297	309	314	345
Green	Clare Andrews	5.7	231	253	256	269	287	326
Liberal Democrats	Gordon Bruce	3.2	128	132	148	148	150	
Alba	Eva Comrie	2.1	84	93	95			
Electorate: 8,643 Valid: 4,028 Spoilt: 111 Quota: 806 Turnout: 47.9%

=== 2018 by-election ===
Clackmannanshire North By-election (1 March 2018)
Party	Candidate	FPv%	Count	
Party	Candidate	FPv%	1	2
SNP	Helen Lewis	36.8	769	980
Conservative	Alex Stewart	31.5	658	784
Labour	Afifa Khanam	23.6	493	
Liberal Democrats	Damian Sherwood-Johnson	4.0	84	
Green	Marion Robertson	3.5	74	
Electorate: 8,457 Valid: 2,078 Spoilt: 14 Quota: 1,040 Turnout: 2,092 (24.7%)

=== 2017 election ===
2017 Clackmannanshire Council election

Clackmannanshire North - 4 seats
Party	Candidate	FPv%	Count							
Party	Candidate	FPv%	1	2	3	4	5	6	7	8
Conservative	Martha Benny	24	969							
SNP	Archie Drummond (incumbent)†	16.6	672	675.5	709.8	745.3	909.8			
SNP	Donald Balsille (incumbent)	16.3	660	666.5	690.6	711.5	841.6			
Labour	Dave Clark (incumbent)	15.9	644	678.7	698.2	764.6	773.8	787.9	794.5	1,196.3
Labour	Bobby McGill (incumbent)	10.7	432	446.7	453.8	507.7	513.7	526.4	530.2	
SNP	Helen Lewis	7.2	292	293.6	313	323.1				
Liberal Democrats	Damian Sherwood-Johnson	5.1	206	240.7	283.9					
Green	Jack Gervaise	3.8	157	167.1						
Electorate: 8,371 Valid: 4,032 Spoilt: 127 Quota: 807 Turnout: 4,159 (49.68%)

=== 2012 election ===
2012 Clackmannanshire Council election

Clackmannanshire North - 4 seats
Party	Candidate	FPv%	Count							
Party	Candidate	FPv%	1	2	3	4	5	6	7	8
SNP	Donald Balsillie (incumbent)	20.09%	728							
Labour	Robert McGill (incumbent)	18.3%	663	663.1	669.1	684.1	1,001.1			
SNP	Walter McAdam (incumbent)	15.02%	544	545.8	559.8	568.8	573.8	600.9	603.9	1,055.4
Independent	Archie Drummond†	14.90%	540	540.1	587.2	664.2	683.2	743.3		
SNP	May Atkinson	13.91%	504	506.7	525.7	535.7	546.7	567	570	
Labour	Jacqueline McKay	9.69%	351	351	366	377				
Conservative	Chris Dixon	4.33%	157	157	173					
Liberal Democrats	John Shier Biggam (incumbent)	3.75%	136	136.1						
Electorate: - Valid: 3,623 Spoilt: 102 Quota: 725 Turnout: 3,725 (%)

=== 2007 election ===
2007 Clackmannanshire Council election

2007 Council election: Clackmannanshire North
Party	Candidate	FPv%	%	Seat	Count
SNP	Donald Balsillie	1,256	26.0	1	1
Labour	Robert McGill	1,099	22.8	2	1
SNP	Walter McAdam	950	19.7	3	2
Labour	Jacqueline McKay	374	7.7		
Conservative	Kate Mason	333	6.9		
Liberal Democrats	John Shier Biggam	322	6.7	4	9
SNP	Helen McGregor	256	5.3		
Scottish Senior Citizens	Ralph Harness	166	3.4		
Scottish Socialist	Iain Campbell	75	1.6		
