= Clackmannanshire Central =

Electoral ward in Scotland

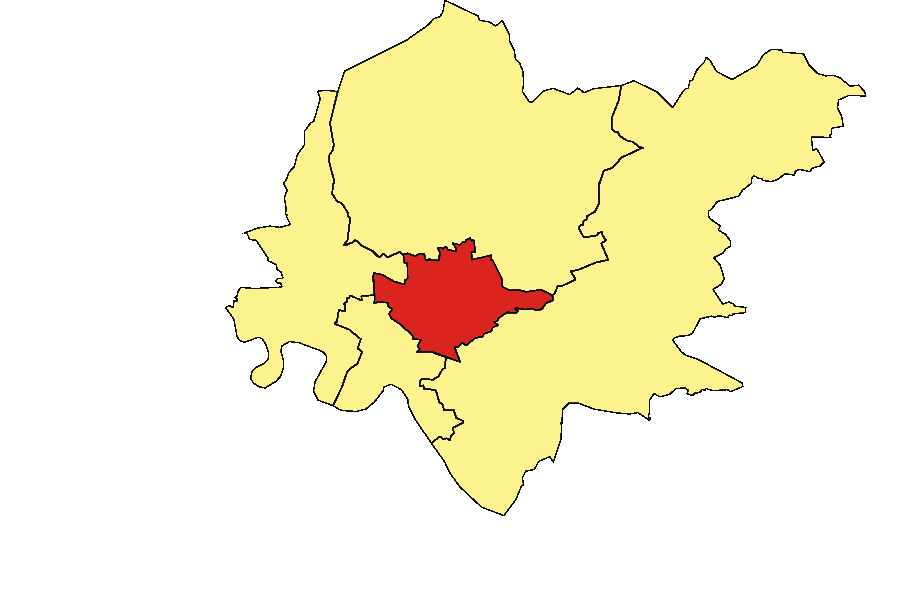
Location of the ward

Clackmannanshire Central is one of the five wards used to elect members of the Clackmannanshire council. It elects three Councillors.

== Councillors ==
Election	Councillors		
2007	Gary Womersley (SNP)	Derek Stewart (Labour)	Samuel Bryce Ovens (Labour)
2012	Gary Womersley (SNP)	Derek Stewart (Labour)	Graham Watt (Labour)
2017	Phil Fairlie (SNP)	Derek Stewart (Labour)	Mike Watson (Conservative)
2019	Jane McTaggart (SNP)	Derek Stewart (Labour)	Mike Watson (Conservative)
2022	Jane McTaggart (SNP)	Janine Rennie (Labour)	Wendy Hamilton (SNP)

== Election results ==
=== 2022 election ===
Clackmannanshire Central - 3 seats
Party	Candidate	FPv%	Count						
Party	Candidate	FPv%	1	2	3	4	5	6	7
SNP	Wendy Hamilton	30.4	730						
Conservative	Kate Mason	17.3	416	417	426	437	455	476	
Labour	Carolynne Hunter	13.3	320	324	332	370			
SNP	Jane McTaggart	13.1	314	419	472	481	506	519	584
Labour	Janine Rennie	12.0	288	291	305	469	757		
Labour	Huw Sherrard	9.4	225	227	234				
Green	John Hosie	4.5	109	119					
Electorate: 6,301 Valid: 2,402 Spoilt: 95 Quota: 601 Turnout: 39.6%

=== 2019 by-election ===
Clackmannanshire Central By-election (28 March 2019)
Party	Candidate	FPv%	Count	
Party	Candidate	FPv%	1	2
SNP	Jane McTaggart	40.9	865	933
Labour	Margaret Brookes	31.9	675	814
Conservative	William Marlin	19.8	419	
UKIP	Dawson Michie	3.3	69	
Green	Marion Robertson	2.5	53	
Liberal Democrats	John Biggam	1.7	36	
Electorate: 6,184 Valid: 2,117 Spoilt: 29 Quota: 1,059 Turnout: (34.7%)

=== 2017 election ===
2017 Clackmannanshire Council election

Clackmannanshire Central - 3 seats
Party	Candidate	FPv%	Count					
Party	Candidate	FPv%	1	2	3	4	5	6
Labour	Derek Stewart (incumbent)	32.8	846					
SNP	Phil Fairlie†††	27.7	714					
Conservative	Mike Watson	16.6	428	443.4	444.6	464.5	550.6	687.3
SNP	Jo Wilkinson	10.5	273	281.7	337.8	393.3	438.2	
Labour	Graham Watt (incumbent)	7.1	183	321.9	324.6	356.4		
Green	John Short	5.1	133	139.1	143.7			
Electorate: 6,297 Valid: 2,577 Spoilt: 79 Quota: 645 Turnout: 2,656 (42.18%)

=== 2012 election ===
2012 Clackmannanshire Council election

Clackmannanshire Central - 3 seats
Party	Candidate	FPv%	Count					
Party	Candidate	FPv%	1	2	3	4	5	6
Labour	Derek Stewart (incumbent)	37.37%	916					
SNP	Gary Womersley (incumbent)	26.97%	661					
SNP	Gaynor Hamilton	17.18%	421	438.5	479.5	493.8	522.7	
Labour	Graham Watt	11.75%	288	547.7	549.7	556.4	583.1	751.9
Independent	Brian Gerard Doyle	3.59%	88	91.9	92.9	118.3		
Conservative	Kate Mason	3.14%	77	80.6	80.1			
Electorate: - Valid: 2,451 Spoilt: 55 Quota: 613 Turnout: 2,506 (%)

=== 2007 election ===
2007 Clackmannanshire Council election

2007 Council election: Clackmannanshire Central
Party	Candidate	FPv%	%	Seat	Count
Labour	Derek Stewart	1,089	35.1	1	1
Labour	Samuel Bryce Ovens	688	22.2	2	2
SNP	Gary Womersley	620	20.0	3	5
SNP	Sandy Pollock	518	16.7		
Conservative	George Murray	190	6.1		
