= Clackmannanshire East =

Electoral ward in Scotland

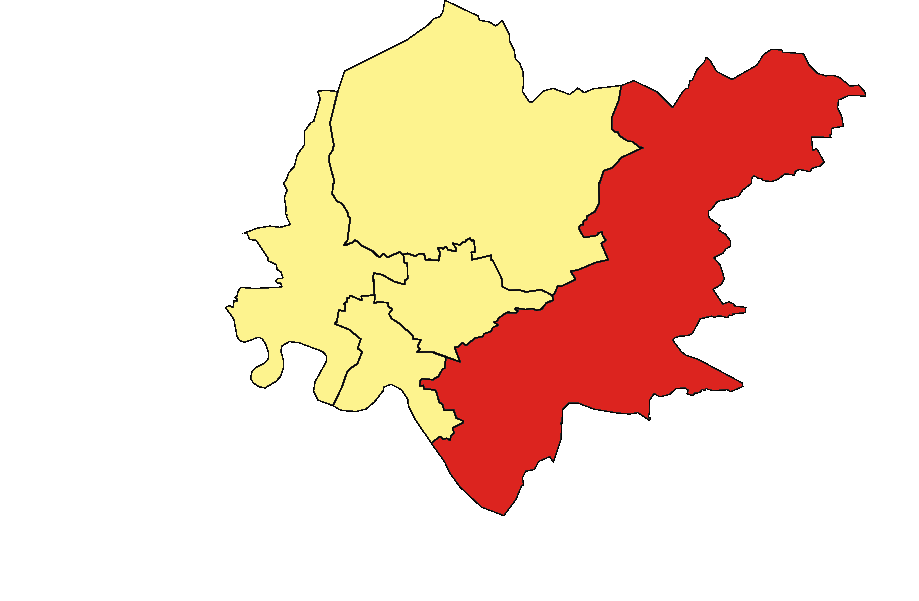
Location of the ward

Clackmannanshire East is one of the five wards used to elect members of the Clackmannanshire council. It elects three Councillors.

== Councillors ==
Election	Councillors		
2007	Irene Hamilton (SNP)	Henry McLaren (Labour)	Alastair Campbell (Conservative)
2012	Irene Hamilton (SNP)	Kathleen Martin (Labour)	Alastair Campbell (Conservative)
2017	Graham Lindsay (SNP)	Kathleen Martin (Labour)	Bill Mason (Conservative)
2020	Graham Lindsay (SNP)	Kathleen Martin (Labour)	Denis Coyne (Conservative)
2022	Scott Harrison (SNP)	Kathleen Martin (Labour)	Denis Coyne (Conservative)

== Election results ==
=== 2022 election ===
Clackmannanshire East - 3 seats
Party	Candidate	FPv%	Count					
Party	Candidate	FPv%	1	2	3	4	5	6
SNP	Scott Harrison	30.8	1,021					
Conservative	Denis Coyne	30.4	1,008					
Labour	Kathleen Martin	19.6	650	685	692	709	760	951
Conservative	Neil Gault	6.9	229	232	384	405	417	435
Green	Marion Robertson	6.3	209	302	305	323	377	
Liberal Democrats	Angus Myles	3.7	123	136	140	153		
Independent	Les Calderwood	2.3	75	82	85			
Electorate: 7,004 Valid: 3,315 Spoilt: 46 Quota: 829 Turnout: 48.0%

=== 2020 by-election ===
Clackmannanshire East by-election (19 November 2020)
Party	Candidate	FPv%	Count
Party	Candidate	FPv%	1
Conservative	Denis Coyne	51.2	1,226
SNP	Stephen Leitch	32.0	766
Labour	Carolynne Hunter	8.1	195
Green	Marion Robertson	5.8	139
Liberal Democrats	Jim Hay	2.9	69
Valid: 2,395 Quota: 1,197

=== 2017 election ===
2017 Clackmannanshire Council election

Clackmannanshire East - 3 seats
Party	Candidate	FPv%	Count			
Party	Candidate	FPv%	1	2	3	4
Conservative	Bill Mason††††	41	1452			
Labour	Kathleen Martin (incumbent)	19.9	706	839.9	868.8	882.2
SNP	Graham Lindsay	19.5	692	699.5	724.7	1079.9
SNP	Jane McTaggart	10.3	363	368.9	390.3	
Liberal Democrats	Anne Anderson	4.3	151	345.3	406.6	414.8
Green	Marion Robertson	3.7	132	160.2		
Electorate: 6,607 Valid: 3496 Spoilt: 40 Quota: 875 Turnout: 3,536 (53.52%)

=== 2012 election ===
2012 Clackmannanshire Council election

Clackmannanshire East - 3 seats
Party	Candidate	FPv%	Count
Party	Candidate	FPv%	1
Conservative	Alastair Campbell (incumbent)	31.40%	817
SNP	Irene Hamilton (incumbent)	30.01%	781
Labour	Kathleen Martin	28.63%	745
SNP	Helen Lewis	9.95%	259
Electorate: - Valid: 2,602 Spoilt: 32 Quota: 651 Turnout: 2,634 (%)

=== 2007 election ===
2007 Clackmannanshire Council election

2007 Council election: Clackmannanshire East
Party	Candidate	FPv%	%	Seat	Count
Conservative	Alastair Campbell	1,040	29.8	1	1
Labour	Henry McLaren	951	27.3	2	1
SNP	Irene Hamilton	669	19.2	3	4
SNP	Alison Lindsay	420	12.0		
Liberal Democrats	Charles Bell	409	11.7		
