= Lingfield Point =

Business park in Darlington, England

Coordinates: 54.5286°N 1.5143°W

- Interactive map of Lingfield Point
- Location: Darlington, County Durham
- Opening date: 2005; 21 years ago
- Developer: Marchday
- Owner: Clearbell
- No. of tenants: 50
- No. of workers: 2,500
- Size: 23,000 m^{2} (250,000 sq ft)
- Website: lingfieldpoint.co.uk

Lingfield Point is a British business park in Darlington, County Durham created on a historic industrial site previously home to Europe's largest wool manufacturing plant developed by Patons & Baldwins.

== History ==
=== Original site ===
Patons & Baldwins built a wool factory at Lingfield Point immediately after the Second World War. Construction started on the new factory in August 1945. The aim was to create a flagship manufacturing base for the knitting yarn company. The 107-acre (0.43 km^{2}) site 2 miles (3.2 km) to the east of the town centre was located next to the Stockton & Darlington Railway line, providing the factory with its own railway sidings.

By 1951 this wool factory was completed at a cost of £7.5m. At over 2,000,000 square feet (190,000 m^{2}) this was one of the largest wool factories in the world.

=== Modern transformation ===
60 years later property developers Marchday transformed this manufacturing base into a large business park – one of the largest employment bases in the Tees Valley employing over 2500 people. Now owned by Clearbell, it is home to over 50 businesses and offers space from 270 sq ft (25 m^{2}) to 150,000+ sqft. Lingfield Point has been recognised by winning a number of national and specialist awards including the British Council of Offices Recycled/Refurbished workspace award in 2009 and previous winners of the Royal Institution of Chartered Surveyors national property management award.

Creativity is set to continue around the 90-acre site thanks to ongoing investment. Lingfield Point hopes to become a flagship for successful regeneration in the North East – continuing to position Darlington as a great base for business.

A new £100m masterplan will see the creation of a flagship, sustainable mixed community built around the existing business community providing up to 1300 homes, sports facilities, a school, healthcare facilities and public, green open space.

Over 250,000 sq ft (23,000 m^{2}) of office space has been let at Lingfield Point in the last five years and more than 2500 people currently work at the business park.

== Transport ==
2 miles (3.2 km) east of Darlington, Lingfield Point is located off the new Eastern Transport Corridor, giving immediate access to the A66 (East/West) which in turn links to J57, A1(M) South, a couple of miles from the A167 which links to J59, A1(M) North.

Lingfield Point is now only minutes away from the region's extensive road network; 5 minutes from Darlington railway station – operating on the East Coast Main Line with over 30 trains per day to London and Edinburgh and 4 miles (6.4 km) from Teesside International Airport.
