= Newel =

Post supporting a staircase or its handrail

A newel, also called a central pole or support column, is the central supporting pillar around which a staircase winds. It can also refer to an upright post that supports or terminates the handrail of a stair banister (the "newel post"). In stairs having straight flights, it is the principal post at the foot of the staircase, but the term can also be used for the intermediate posts on landings and at the top of a staircase. Although its primary purpose is structural, newels have long been adorned with decorative trim and designed in different architectural styles.

Newel posts turned on a lathe are solid pieces that can be highly decorative, and they typically need to be fixed to a square newel base for installation. These are sometimes called solid newels in distinction from hollow newels due to varying techniques of construction. Hollow newels are known more accurately as box newel posts. In historic homes, folklore holds that the house plans were placed in the newel upon completion of the house before the newel was capped.

The most common means of fixing a newel post to the floor is to use a newel post fastener, which secures a newel post to a timber joist through either concrete or wooden flooring.

== In popular culture ==
A loose ball-cap finial on the newel post at the base of the stairway is a plot device in the 1946 classic It's a Wonderful Life. The same is used in jest in the 1989 film Christmas Vacation, in which Clark Griswold, in an emotional meltdown, cuts a loose finial off a newel post with a chainsaw. He casually exclaims, "Fixed the newel post!" and carries on.

In Family Guy season 17, episode 16, "You Can't Handle the Booth", Stewie and Brian argue over the semantics of Peter getting stuck in what Stewie calls "banister slats" and Brian corrects him by saying they are called "baluster slats". Stewie then asks if the "baluster" is the big, round thing at the bottom of the stairs where the staircase begins, to which Brian laughs at him and corrects him by saying "I believe what you are referring to is a newel post".

The comedy duo Nichols and May performed a routine about a frustrating attempt to obtain operator assistance from a trio of unhelpful telephone operators, the first of whom uses a bizarre phonetic alphabet to clarify the spelling of the requested name, where "newel post" represents the letter N: "'K' as in 'knife'; 'A' as in 'aardvark'; 'P' as in 'pneumonia'; 'L' as in 'luscious'; 'A' as in 'aardvark' again; 'N' as in 'newel post', Kaplan?"

== Gallery ==
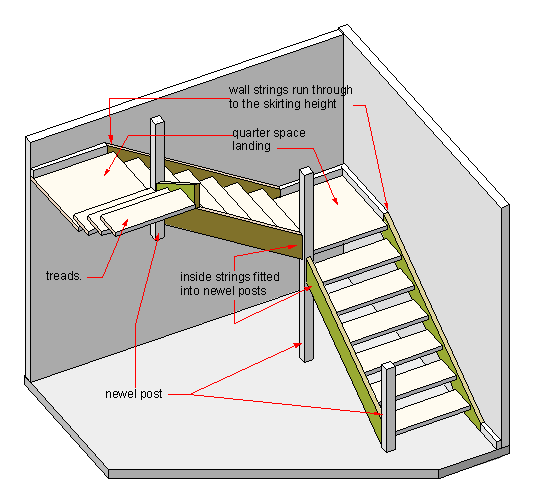
A sketch of a stair with two quarter-space landings showing three types of newel posts

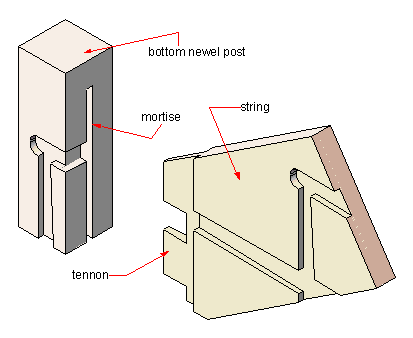
The bottom joint between the newel post and the outside string showing the housings for the tread and first and second risers

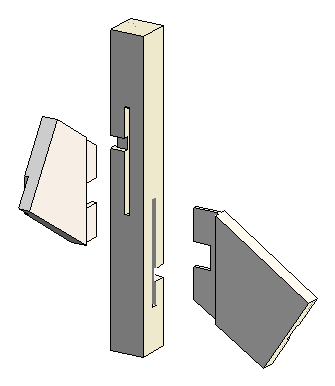
The joint between the string and newel as seen from the stairwell

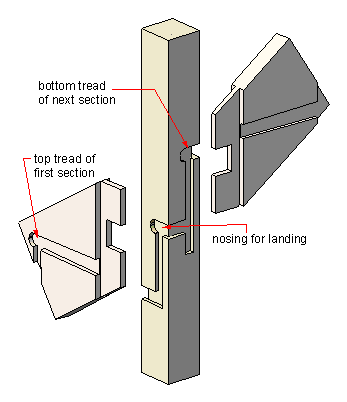
The joint between the string and newel as seen from the stair

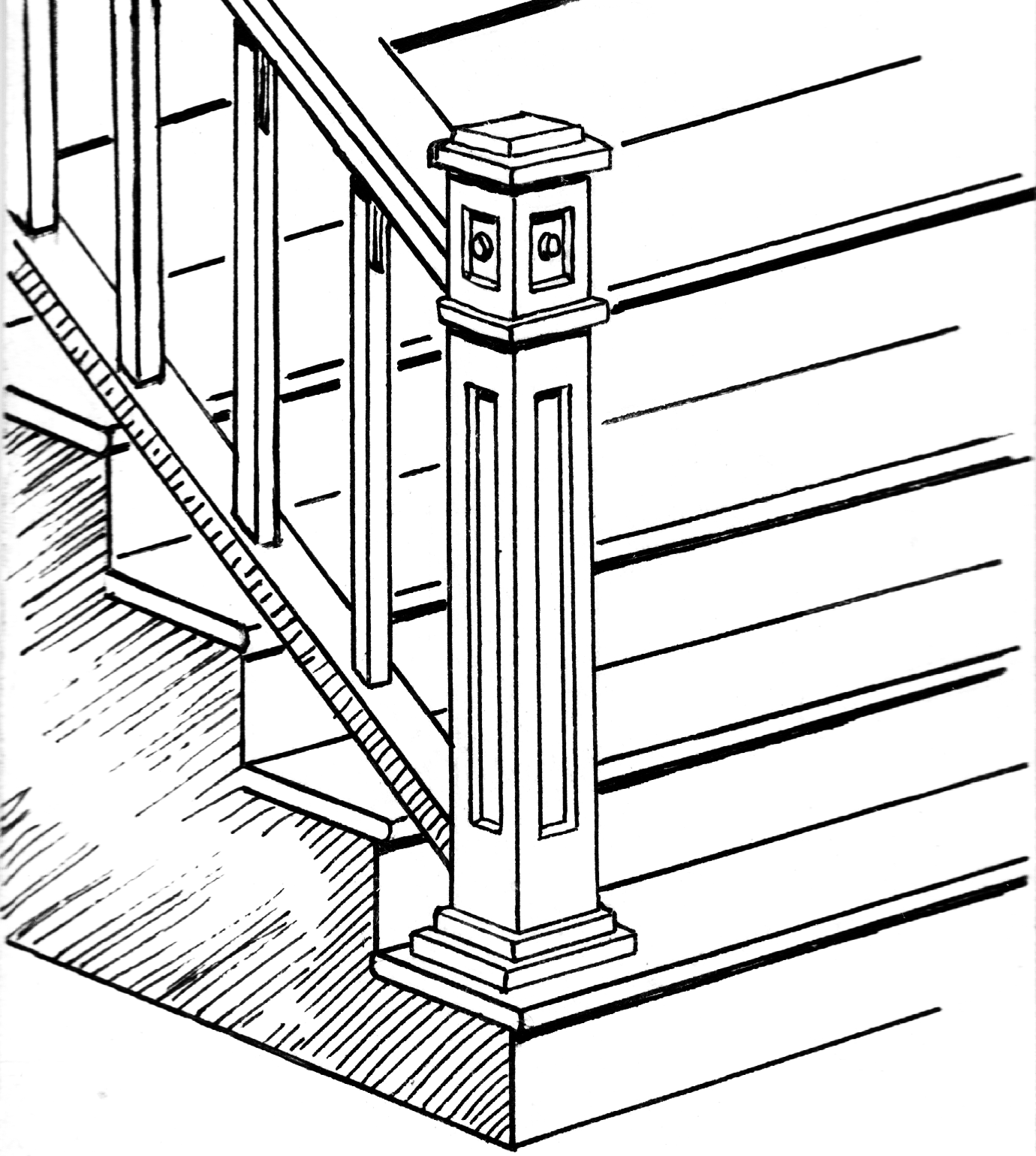
Illustration of a box newel

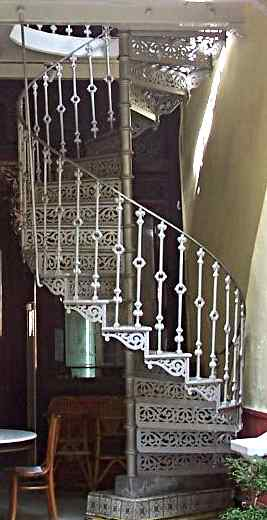
A cast iron spiral staircase showing the central newel post that supports the treads, risers and balustrade.

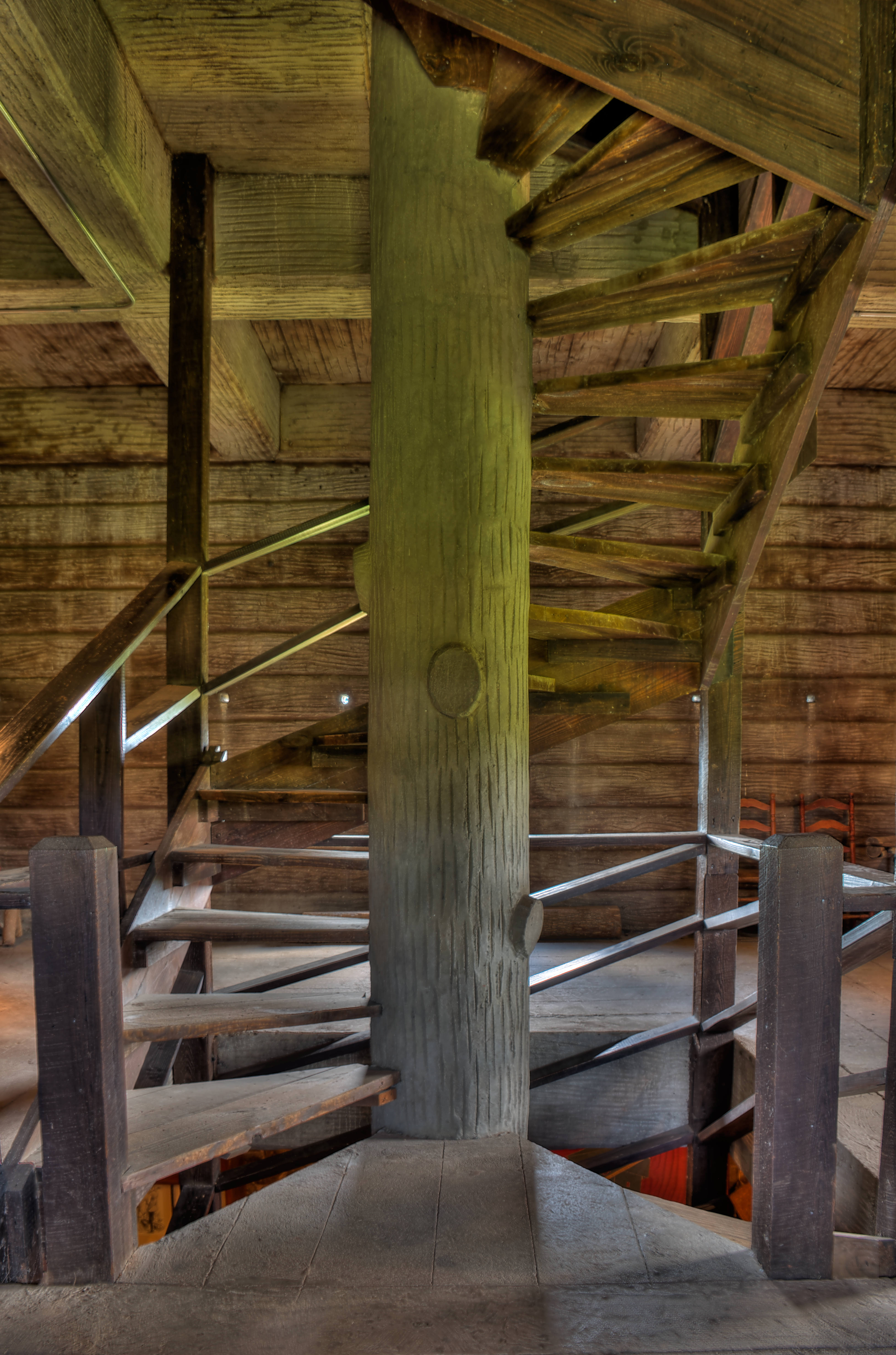
Central newel of spiral staircase at Fort Benjamin Hawkins

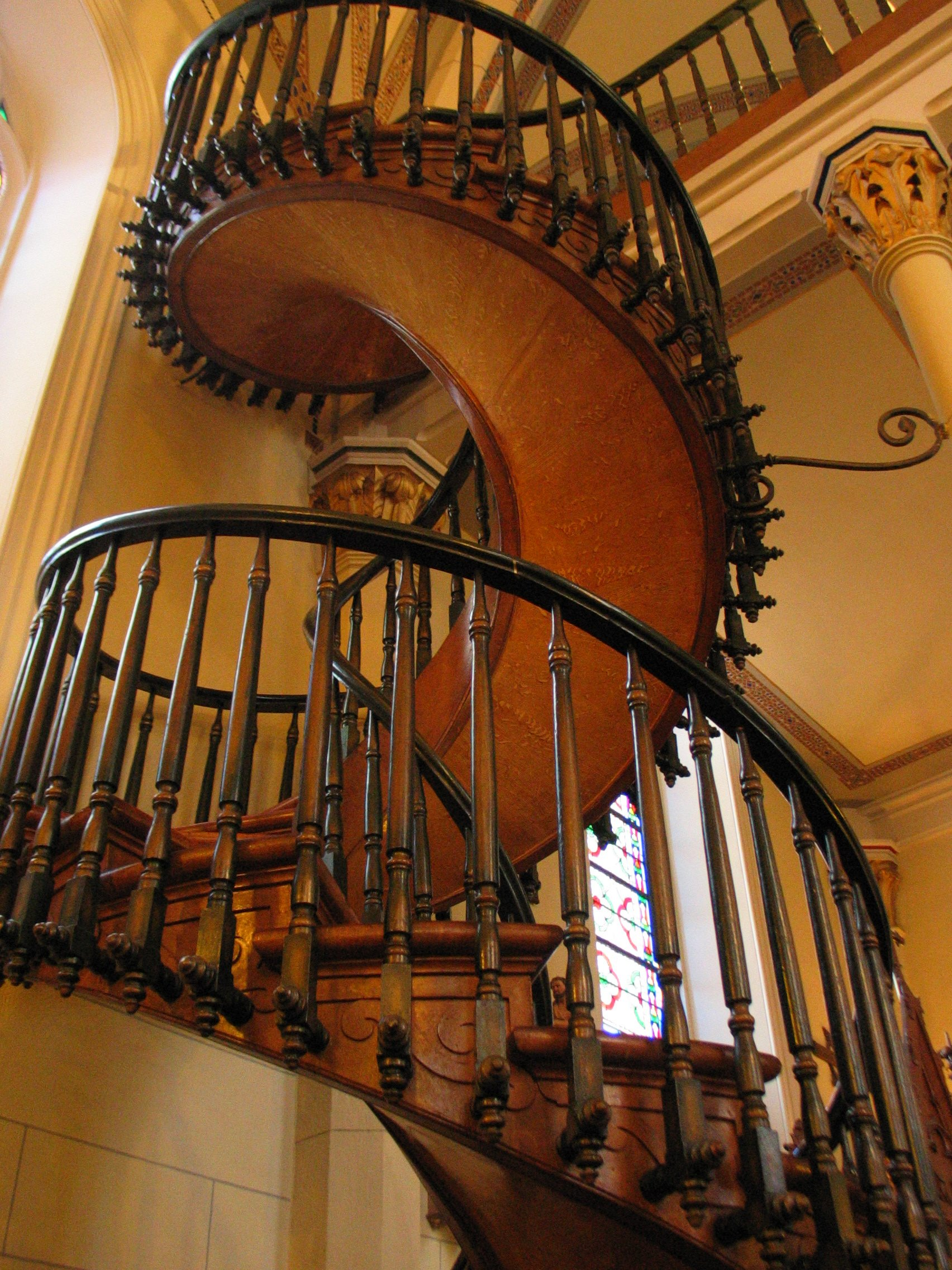
There is no newel in Loretto Chapel's spiral staircase (the "Miracle stair") in Santa Fe, New Mexico, US.

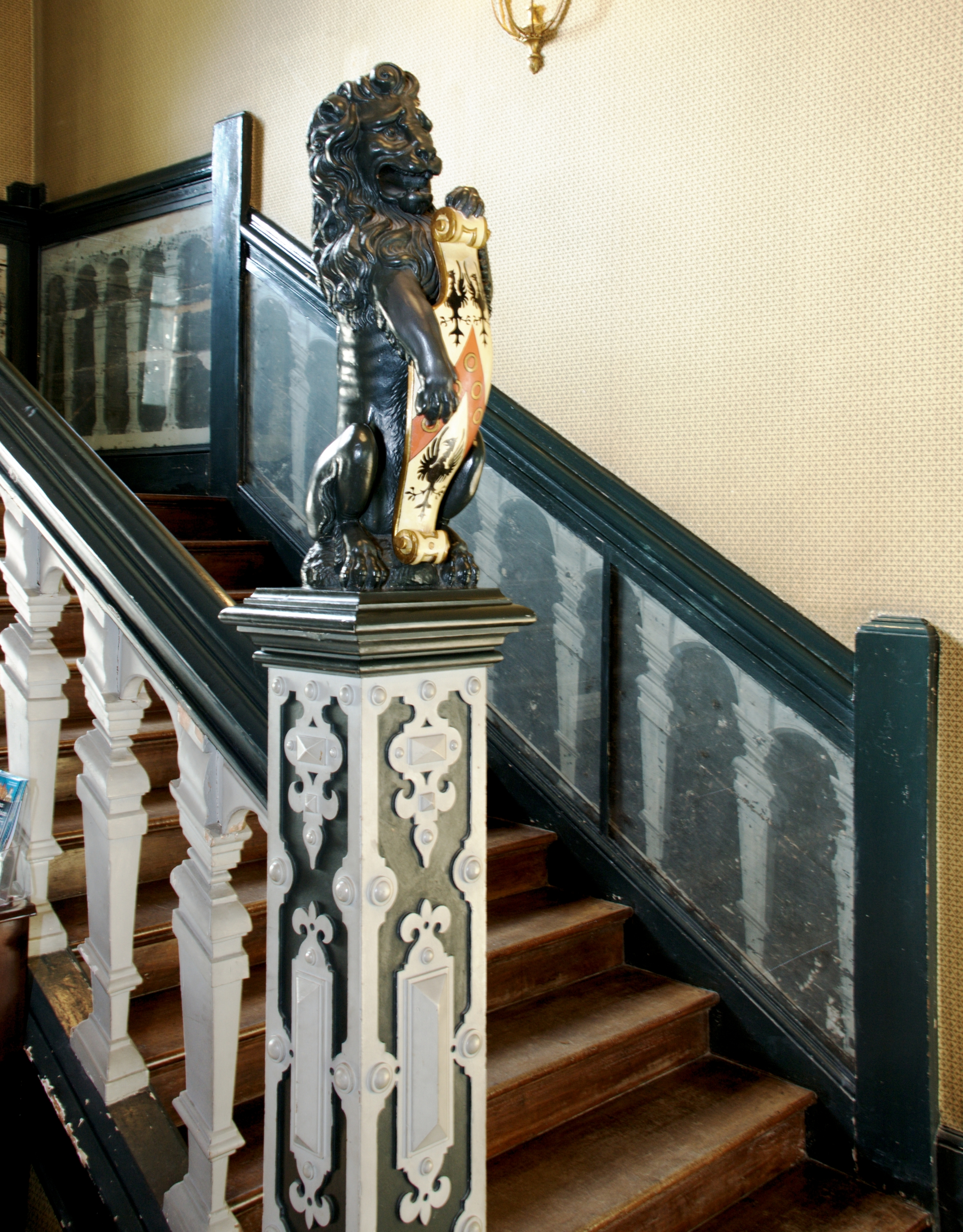
Box newel and finial of a Jacobean staircase in Boston Manor House, United Kingdom

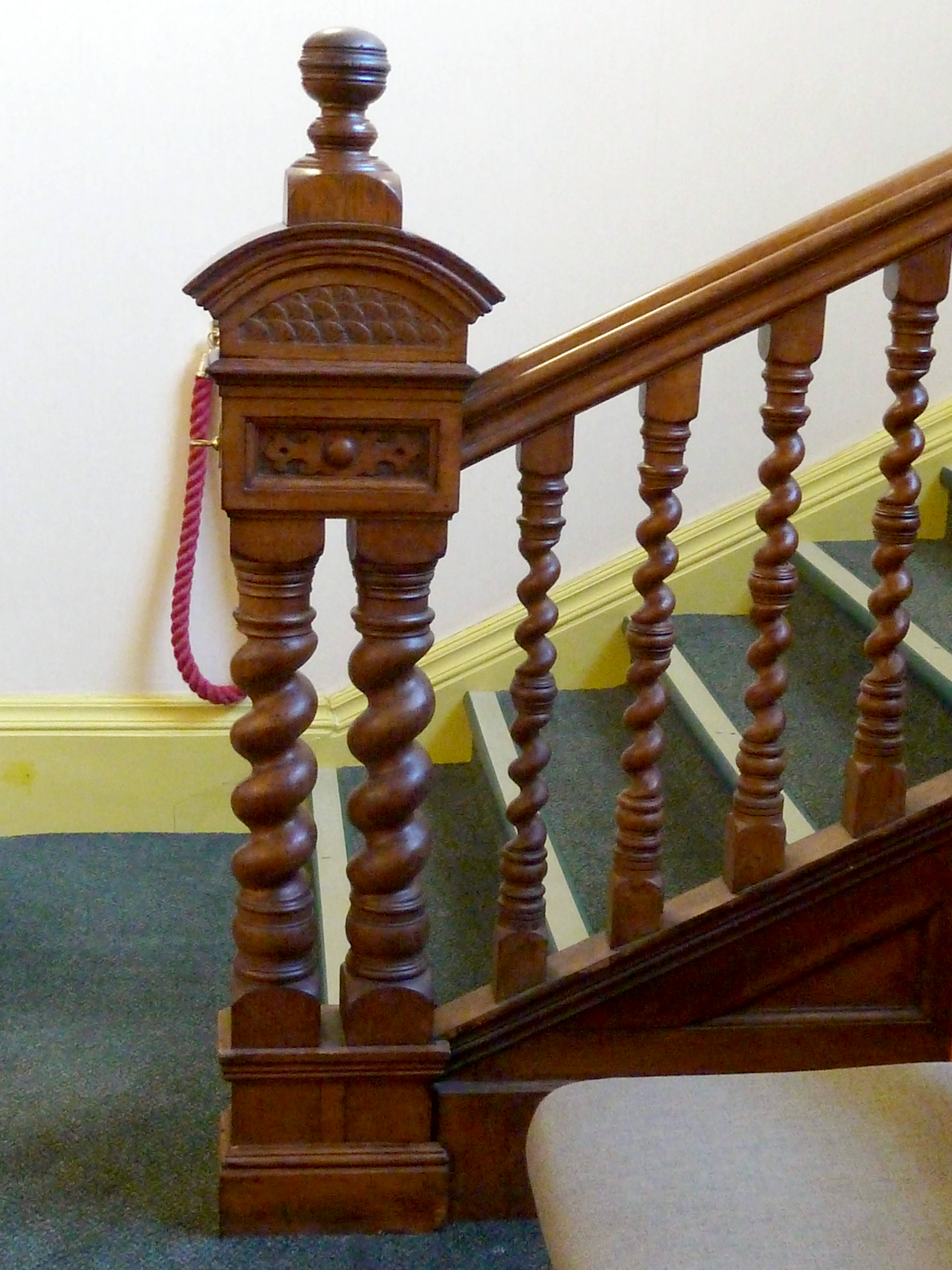
Arts and Crafts newel designed by W.S. Barber, at Spring Hall, Halifax

== See also ==
- Mortgage button
