= Spring Hall =

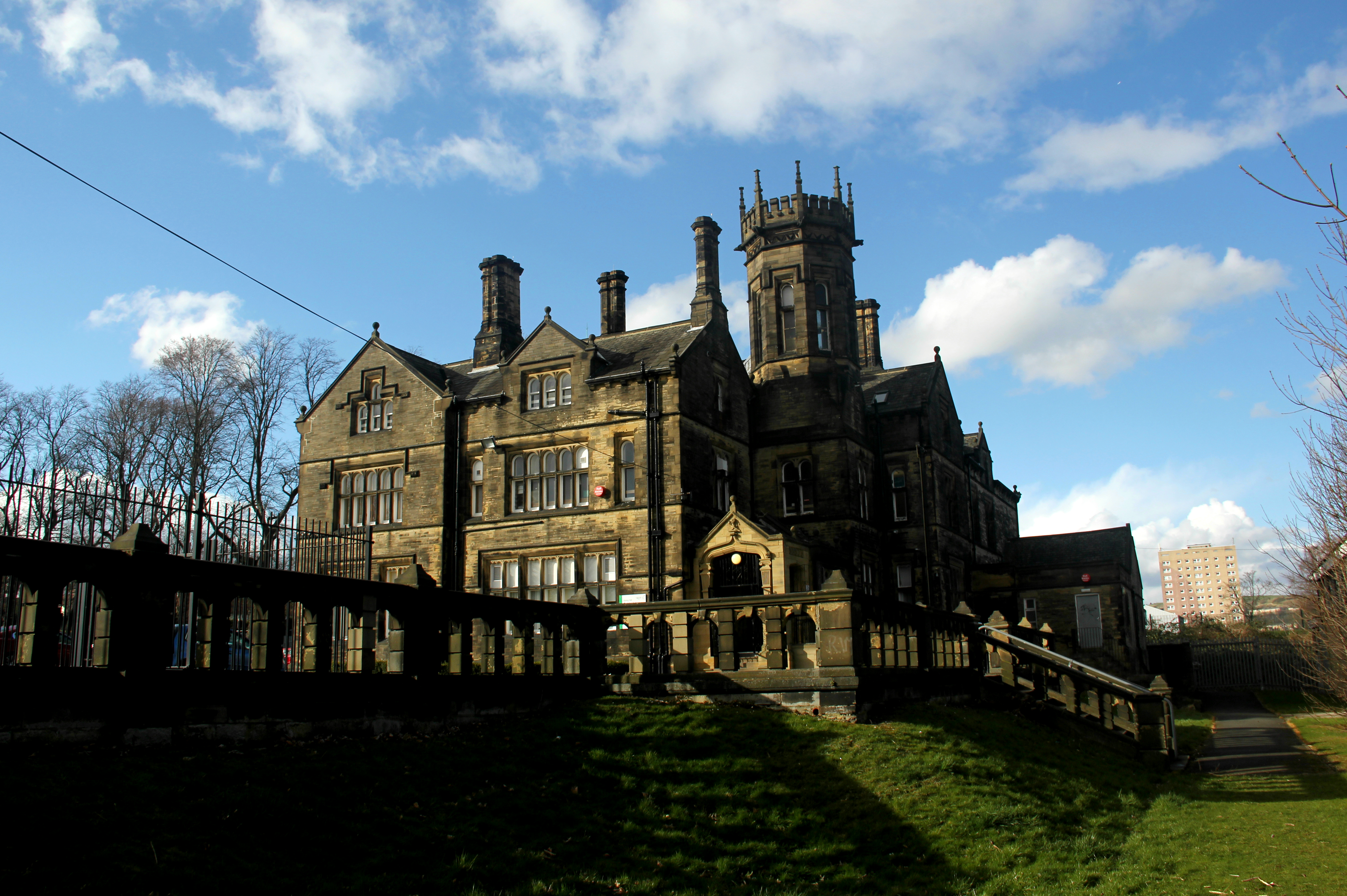
- Spring Hall in 2014

- Location within West Yorkshire
- Alternative names: Spring Hall Mansions

General information
- Type: Mansion
- Architectural style: Gothic Revival; Arts and Crafts
- Location: Huddersfield Road, Halifax, West Yorkshire, HX3 0AQ, England
- Coordinates: 53°42′42″N 1°51′25″W
- Elevation: 128 m (420 ft)
- Current tenants: Calderdale Register Office
- Completed: Before 1614; rebuilt 1871
- Renovated: 2009
- Client: Tom Holdsworth (1870–1871)
- Owner: Calderdale Metropolitan Borough Council

Technical details
- Floor count: 4

Design and construction
- Architecture firm: Mallinson and Barber

Website
- Calderdale Register Office

Spring Hall, also known as Spring Hall Mansions, is a mansion situated off the Huddersfield Road, Halifax, West Yorkshire. A house had been built on the site by 1614, but it was demolished in 1870 leaving only the cellars. It was rebuilt in Gothic Revival style and completed in 1871 to a larger ground plan by architects James Mallinson and William Swinden Barber for Tom Holdsworth.

In World War I, the house served as a hospital. It remained in the family's ownership until the death of Holdsworth's nephew in 1920. Subsequently, it became a boarding house, and passed through several hands until it was presented to Halifax Corporation in 1948. After most of the grounds had been sold off, the remainder was used for sports and recreation, the building was later used as a ballet studio. The building fell into disrepair but was renovated in 2009. As of 2014, Calderdale Register Office has officiated at wedding ceremonies in the Hall's ground floor suite since 2011, and the upper floors are now rented out as office space.

Although many of Barber's buildings are now listed, Spring Hall remains unlisted, although it retains its 17th-century cellars and many original 1871 features including the painted and galleried Arts and Crafts grand staircase.

== Architect ==
By 1871 when he designed this mansion in partnership with James Mallinson (1819–1884), William Swinden Barber (1832–1908) was an established and respected local architect, having designed and co-designed important public buildings and churches in the Halifax area. He was a Gothic Revival and Arts and Crafts architect, having connections with leading artists in these movements through mutual founder-membership of the Artists Rifles. Today, fifteen or more examples of his work are now Grade II listed buildings. The original plans by Mallinson and Barber of the rebuild, dated April 1870, still exist at West Yorkshire Archive Service.

== Structural history ==
The building is first recorded as Spring Hall in 1614. It has been known as Spring Hall Mansions at least since 1927, and is not listed, although it is a major design by Mallinson and Barber. In 1870–1871 it was razed to ground level to enable a rebuild, leaving only the 17th-century arched cellars. They extended the ground plan and constructed the present Gothic Revival and Arts and Crafts mansion which was completed in 1871. The work involved an application in February 1871 from the architects to alter the fence wall between the Spring Hall estate and the Huddersfield turnpike road.

=== Exterior ===
During office hours, most of the exterior and the remaining grounds are accessible to the public. Spring Hall is a large, three-storey, cellared building which was originally set in its own grounds. It has pitched roofs, gables and tall, Elizabethan-style chimneys. There is a four-storey, octagonal, pinnacled tower and a ground-floor entrance-porch at the south-east corner (pictured below). The west side, which faces the drive and the Huddersfield Road, has two non-functioning gargoyles representing a dog and fox on the outer corners of the central bay of the first floor. Besides being evident from outside, these gargoyles can be seen through adjacent windows, from inside the building. The lintel above the ground floor window on the same bay is carved with a frieze of stylised flower motifs separated by a zigzag line, and the window below contains stone frames with double ogee curves along the top edges. Above the south-east entrance porch is the Holdsworth family crest carved in stone: a lion rampant, holding an opened scroll.

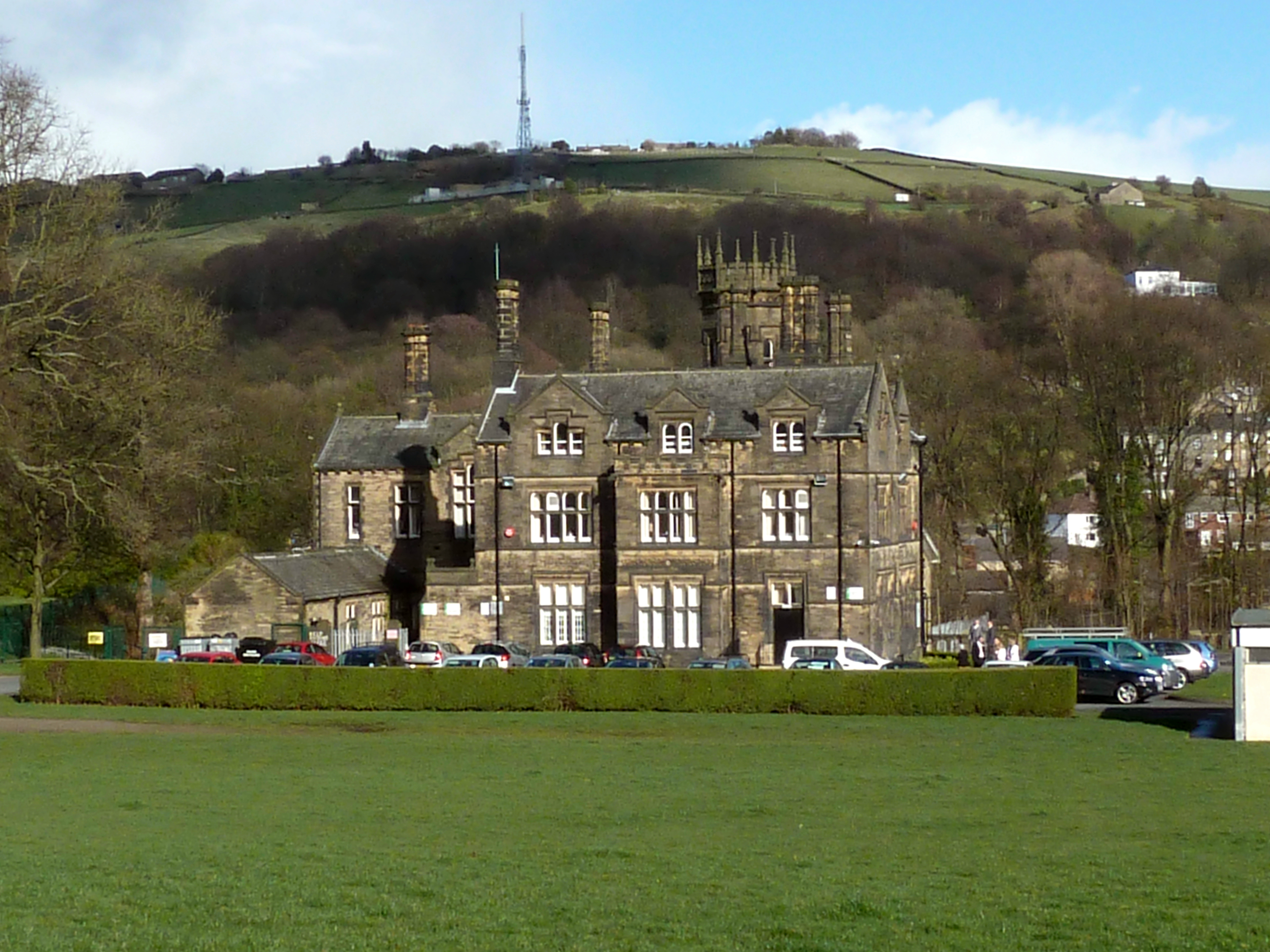
Spring Hall in its setting

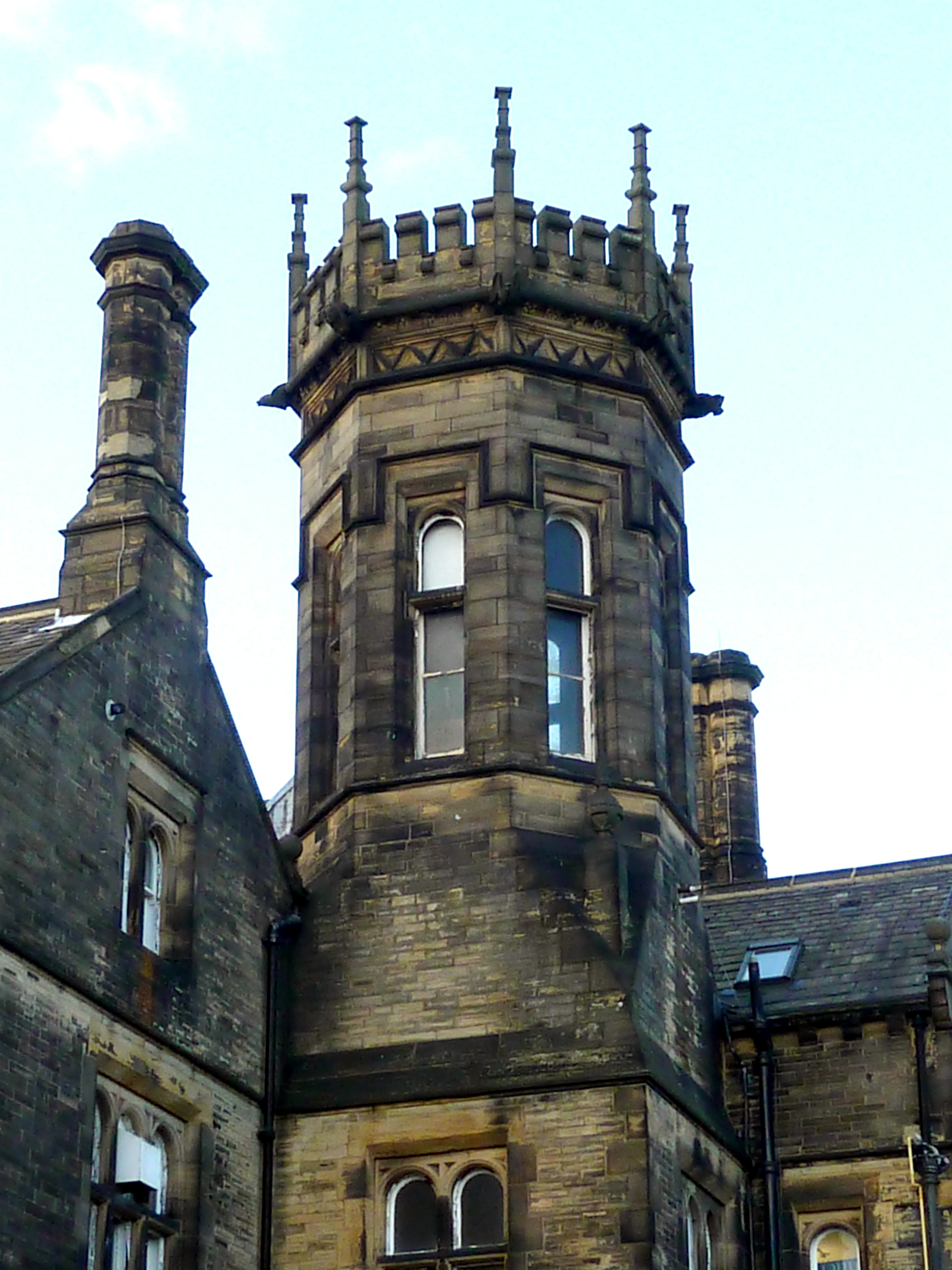
Tower

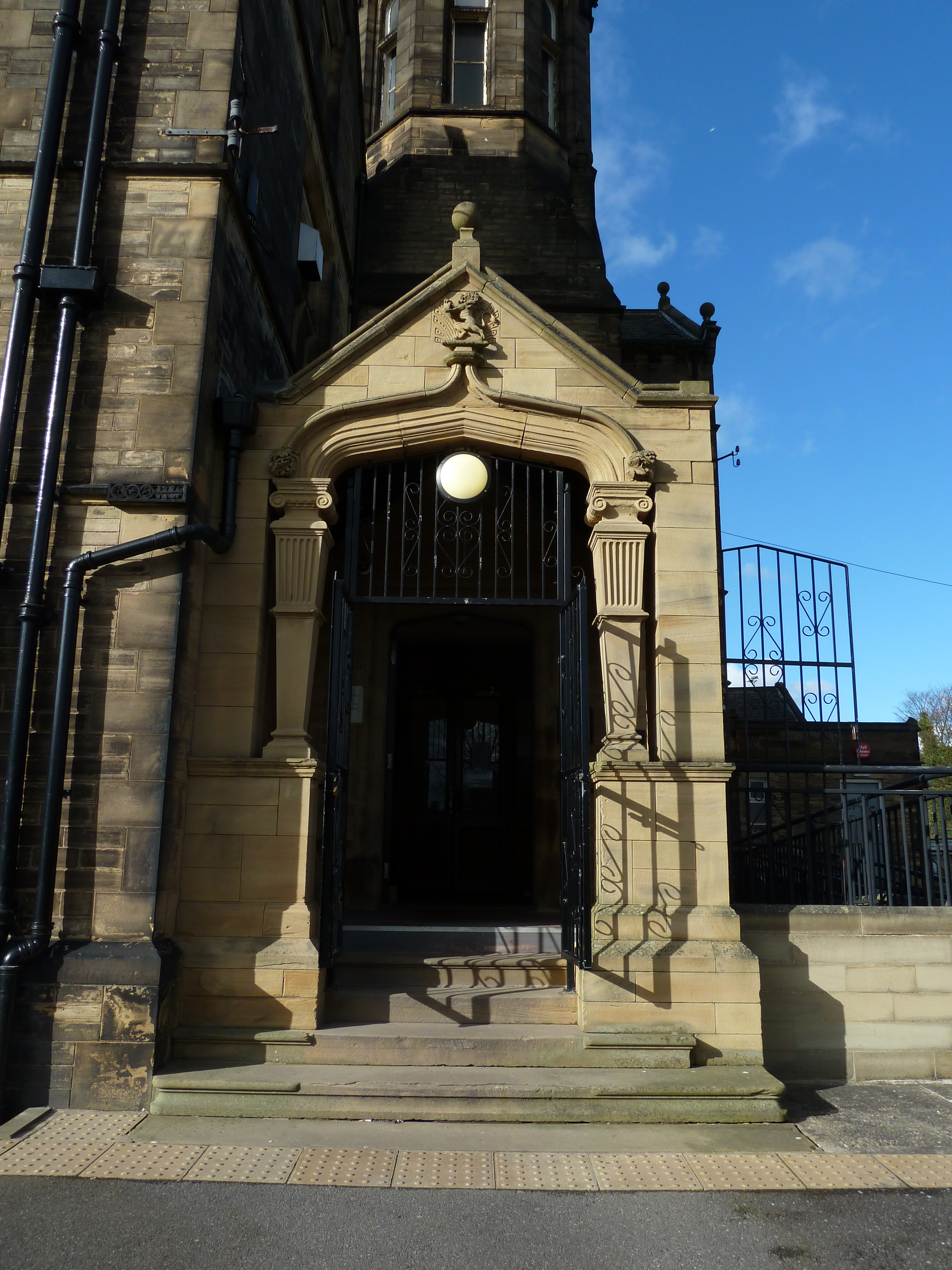
Porch

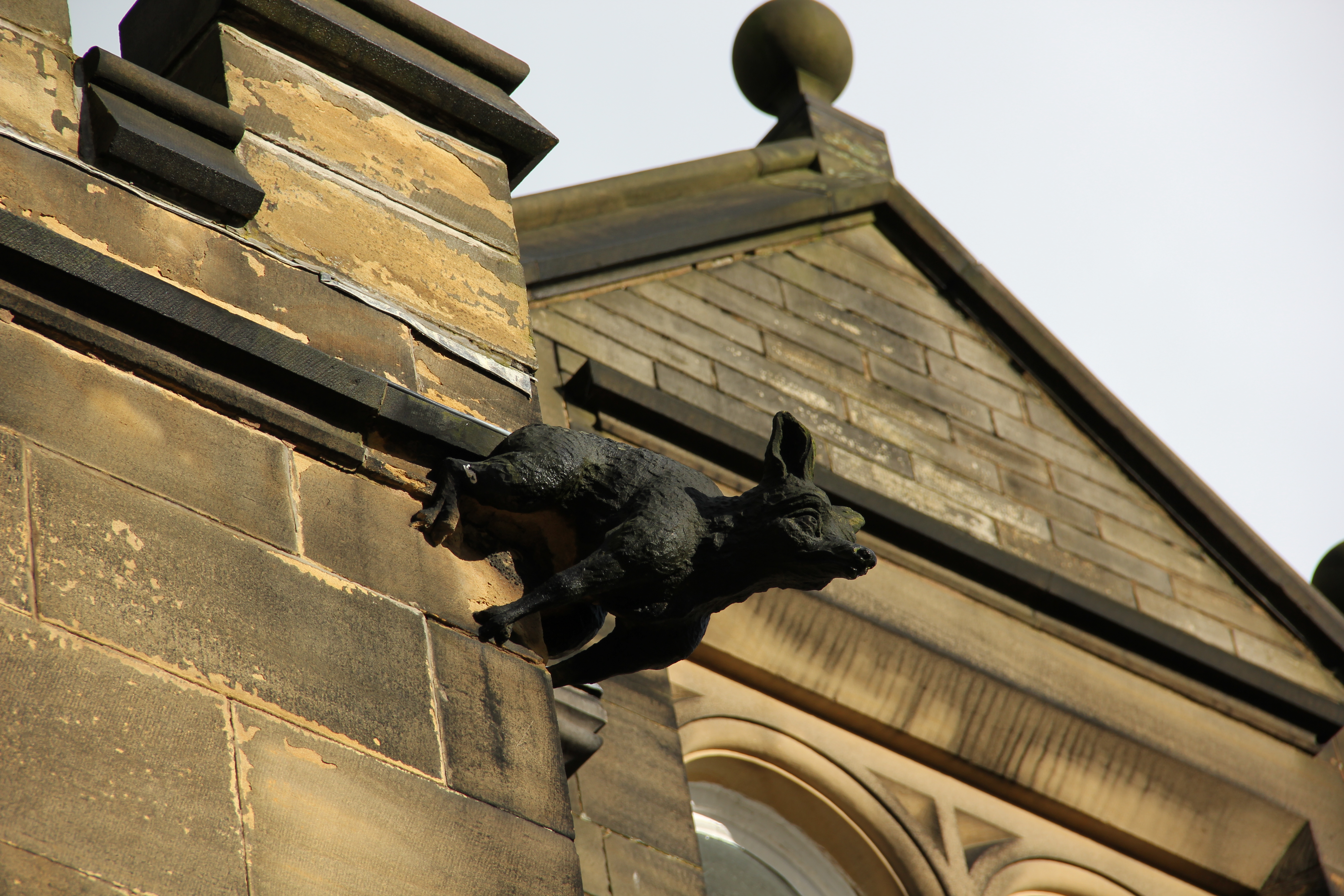
Fox gargoyle

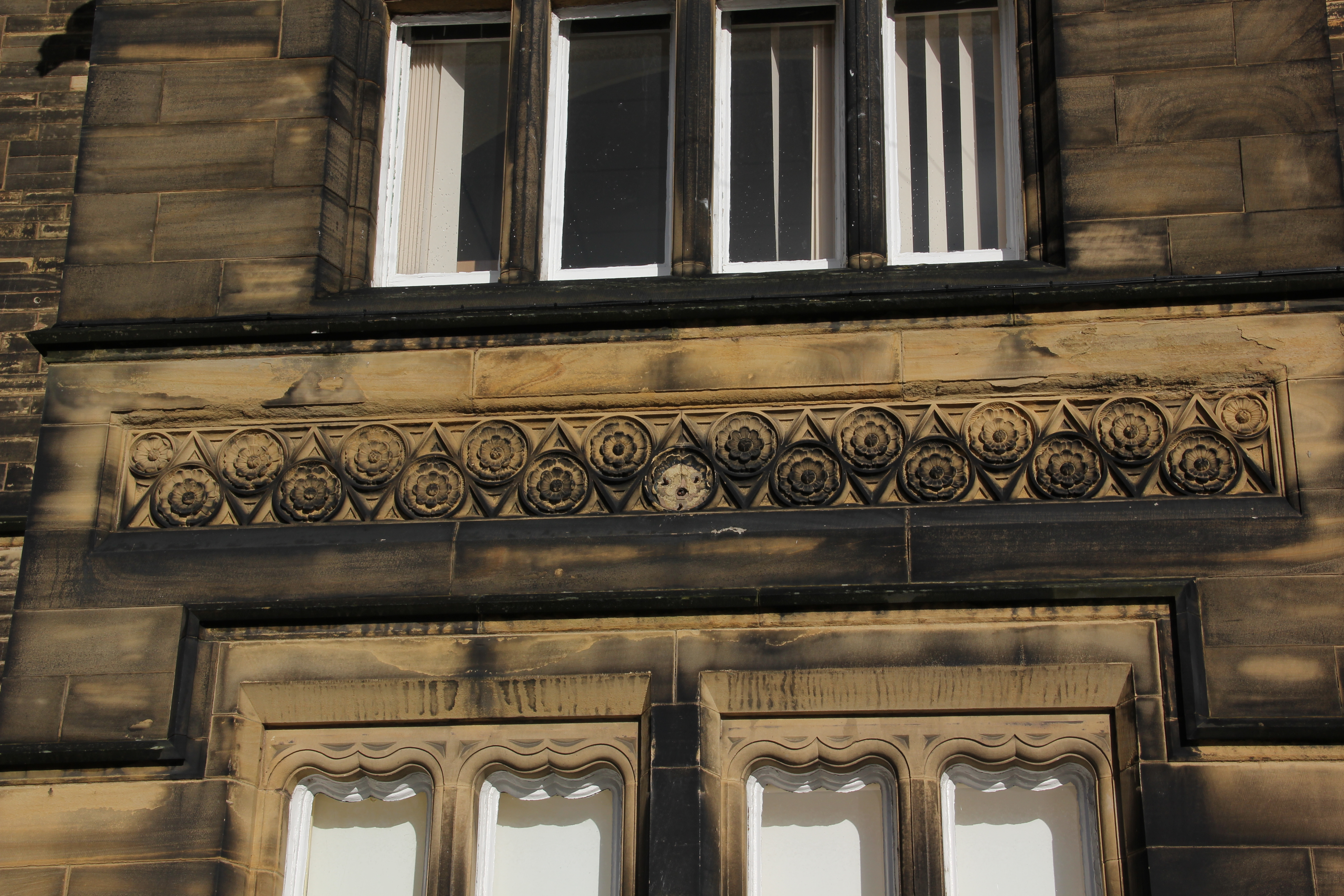
West window lintel

=== Interior ===
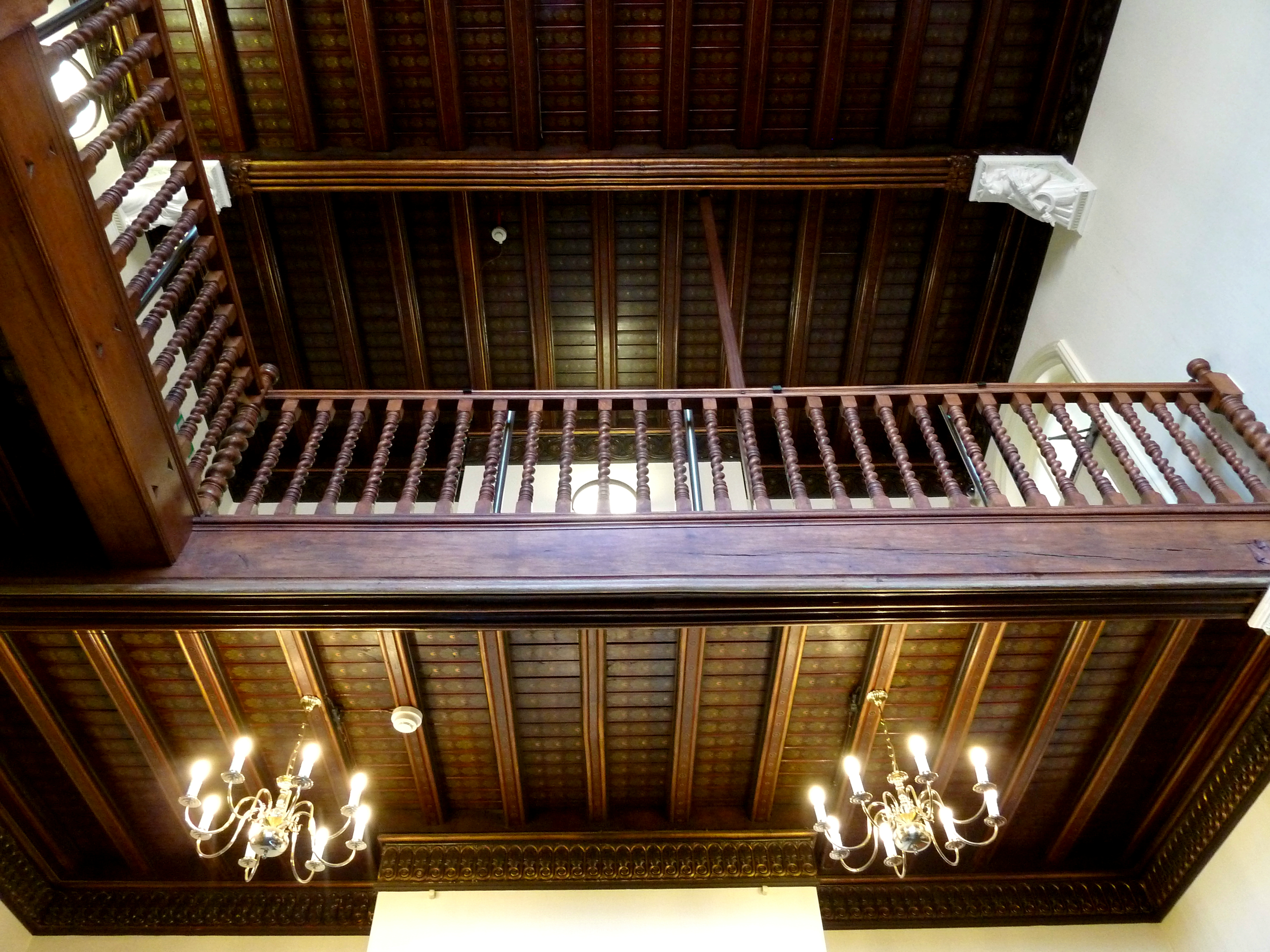
Galleried grand staircase

Inside the building, only the porch and entrance hall are accessible to the public, during office hours. Although as of 2014 much of the interior has been adapted for office use and for the Calderdale Register Office, the grand Arts and Crafts wooden staircase has survived intact, along with some wall and ceiling decoration. The lower part of the staircase is visible from the entrance hall.

The dark-varnished and galleried staircase retains faded gilding and stencilled motifs on its first floor ceiling and on the underside of the first landing, visible from the ground floor. The decorative, carved frieze around these ceilings also still has old and faded gilding. The newel post is of unusual design. There are four carved wood and plaster corbels supporting the first floor staircase ceiling. They represent a woman with grapes and flowers, a winged cherub, a man with harvest motifs and a full-bearded man in medieval costume, carrying scrolls. In the latter corbel which overlooks the stairwell, the bearded man's profile is similar to Barber's profile in his portrait by David Wilkie Wynfield, and his scrolls are long and slim enough to be building plans. These details raise the question as to whether it is a portrait of the architect, placed to overlook his work. The plaster corbels on the ground floor staircase ceiling are carved with lions, in connection with the Holdsworth family crest.

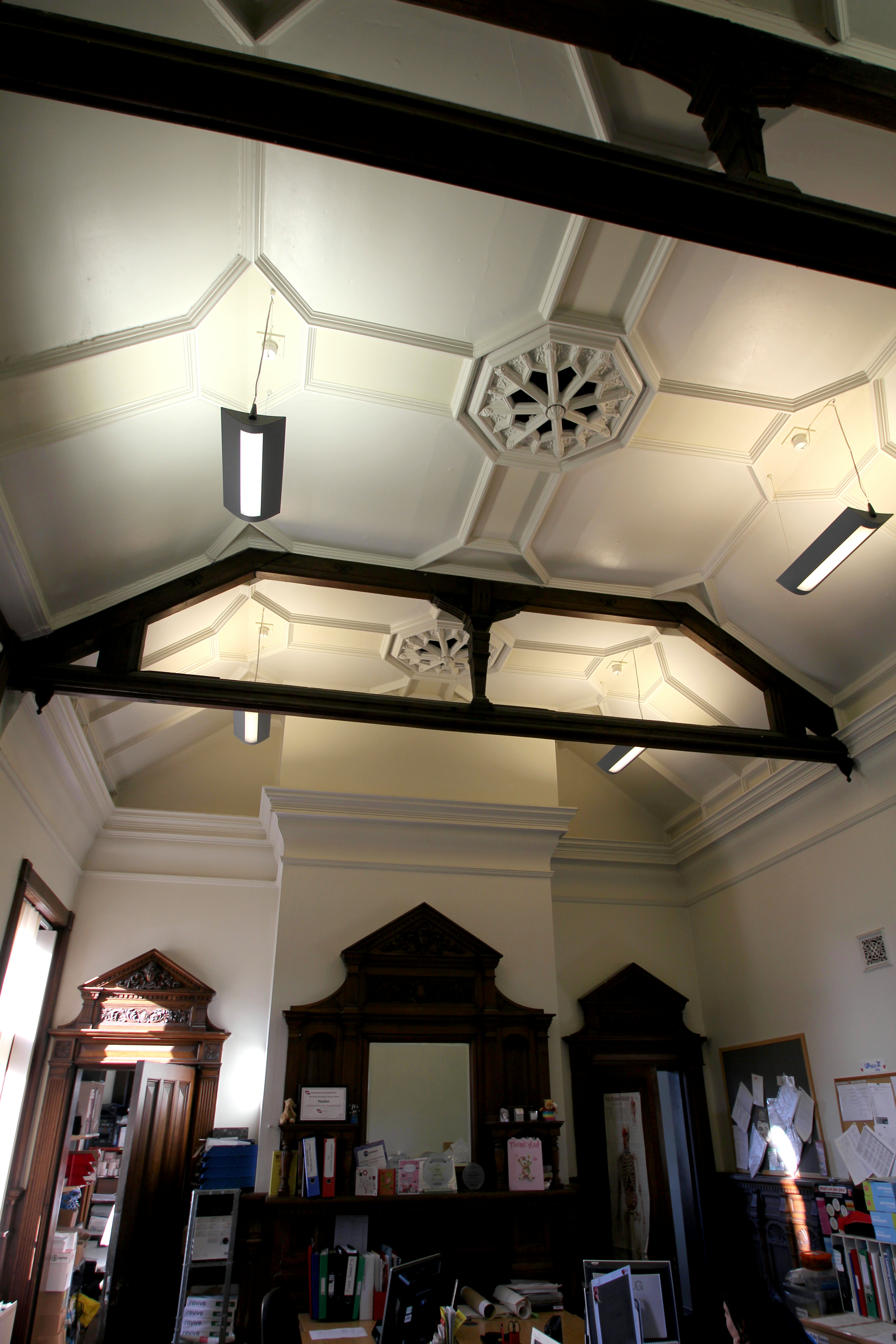
Music room

Two original first-floor fireplaces survive. One of these has an over-painted stone surround and mantelpiece, and a hearth surfaced with Arts and Crafts tiles. The other one in the music room is a large and decoratively carved oak affair, with matching doorways either side. These doors open into a dressing room, allowing the fireplace to be a backdrop for performances. The doors and fireplace contain half-columns and pediments in a semi-neoclassical style, with a carved frieze of fruit and leaves, and the helmeted head of St Cecilia, patroness of musicians. The hearth contains a hand-made Arts and Crafts cast iron hood and moulded, coloured ceramic tiles on the surround. The hearth's floor tiles have been removed. The music room has a carved, oak dado, and a decorative plaster ceiling with ceiling roses which double as ventilators, and there are the original wooden beams designed to support the heavy hung ceiling.

On the ground floor, a decorative plaster ceiling with layered and coloured cornice survives in the wedding room of the register office. That room, like several others, has a large window set back into an arch, as viewed from the interior. Another ground floor room also has a deep, decorative plaster cornice, but no decoration on the ceiling.

In the cellar is the boiler room which was originally one of the kitchens, having the remains of a fireplace and of a Belfast sink. At least two of the rooms at this level, including the present boiler room, are the remaining cellars of the original 17th-century house. They are part of the old foundations, having arched ceilings and supporting walls. At least one other cellar room has a 19th-century flat ceiling made of wooden joists and laths, showing that the room is part of Barber's 1871 extension.

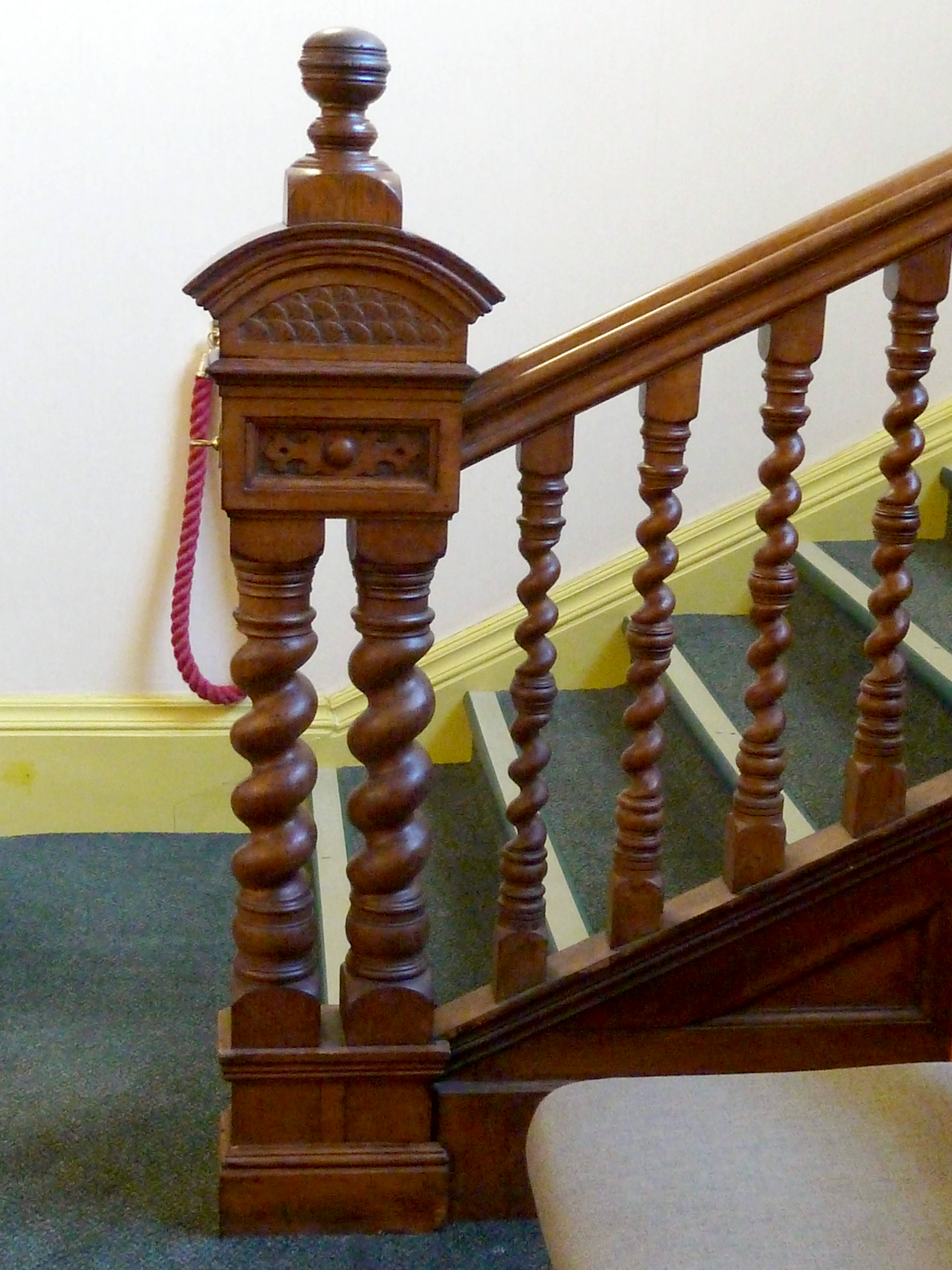
Grand staircase newel post

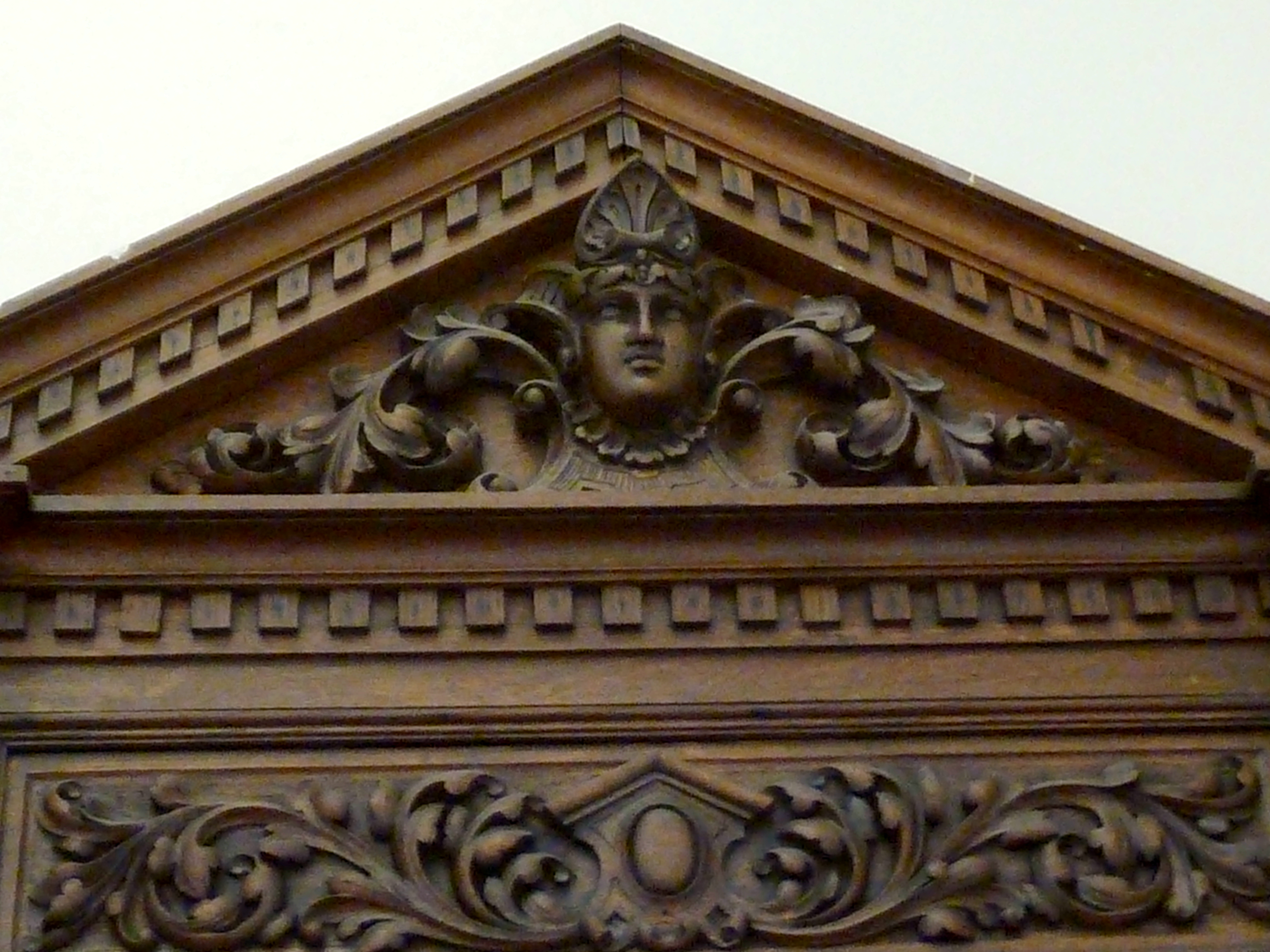
Carved pediment in music room

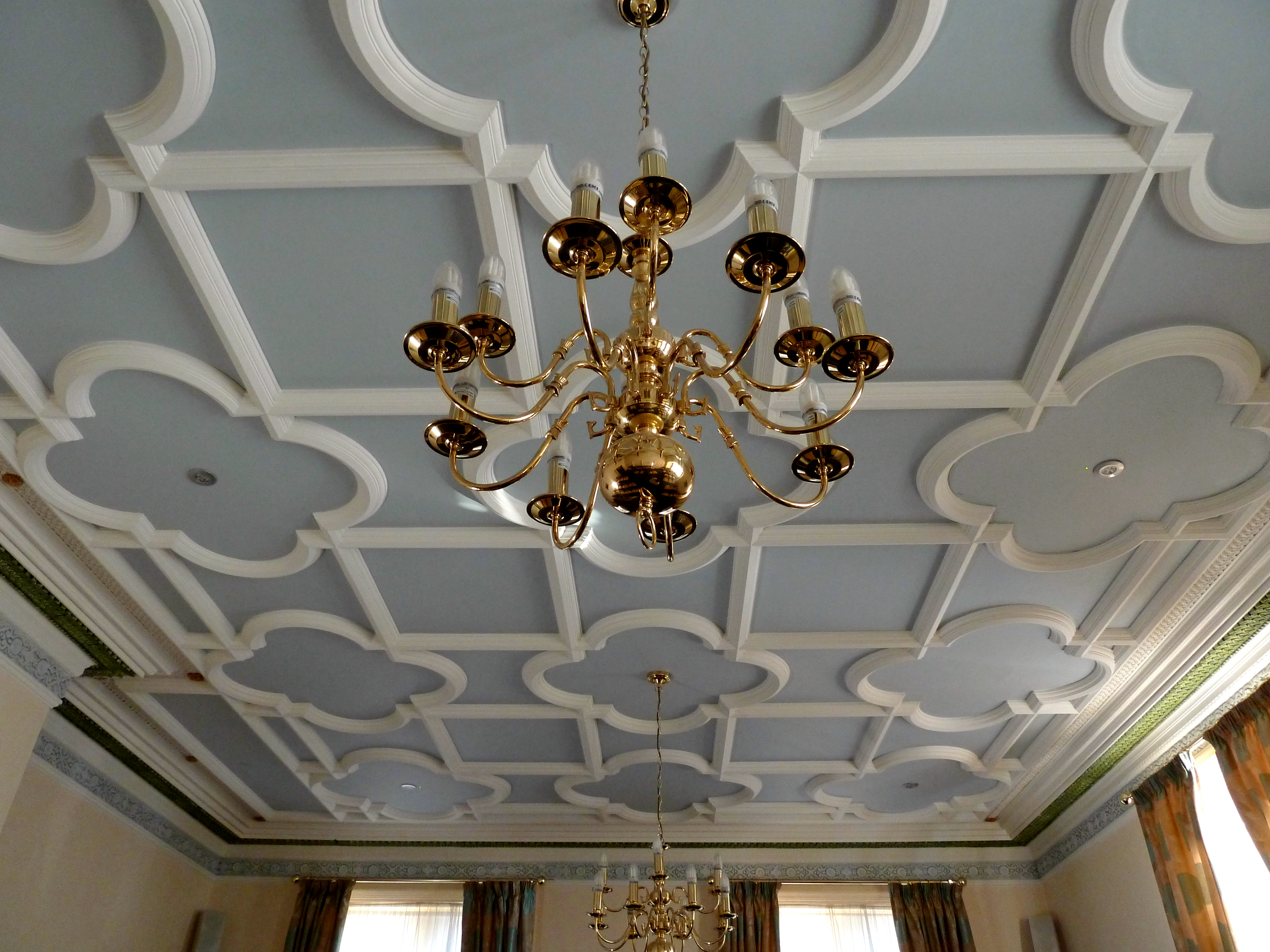
A ground floor ceiling

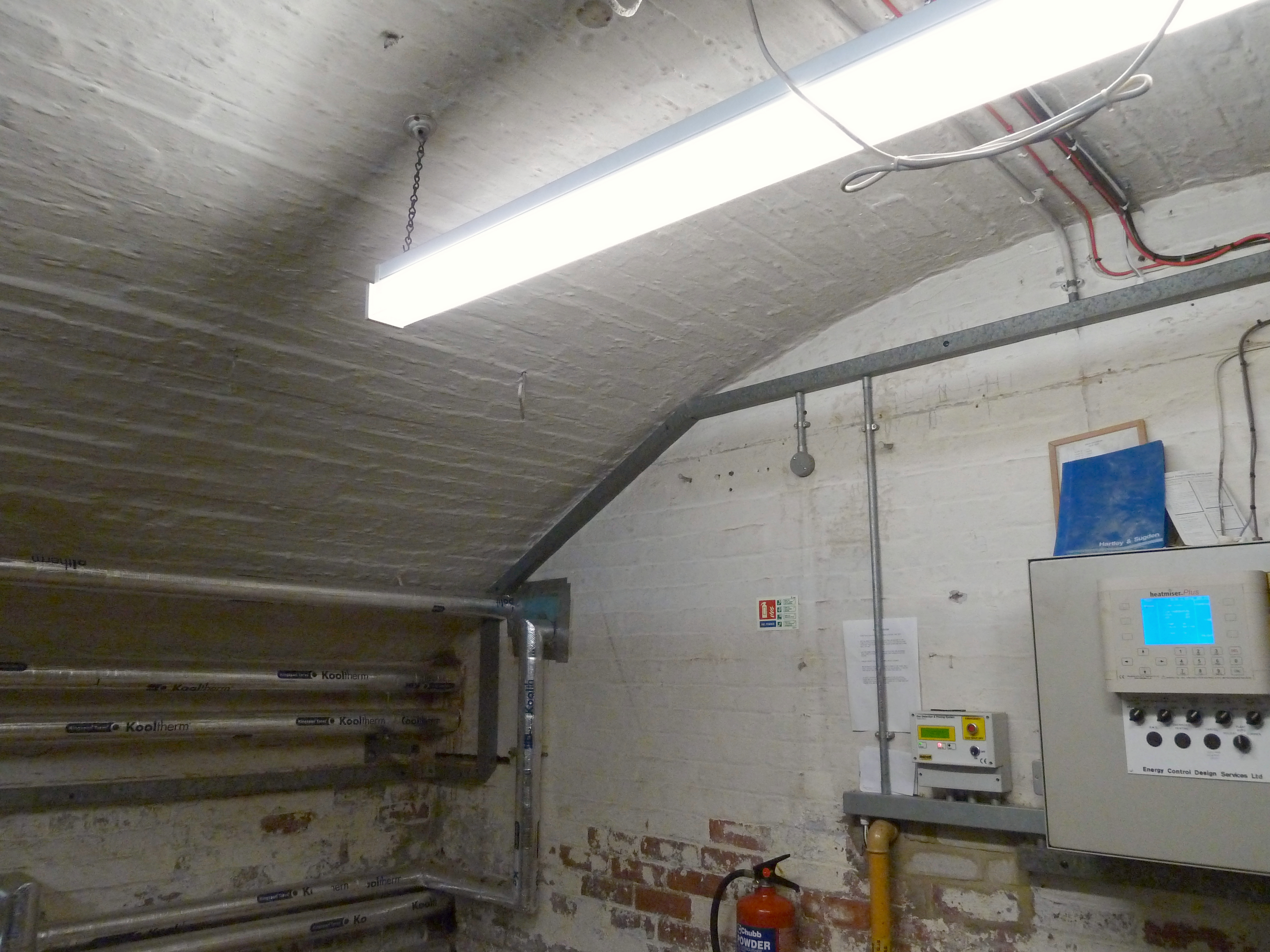
Arched 17th-century ceiling in cellar

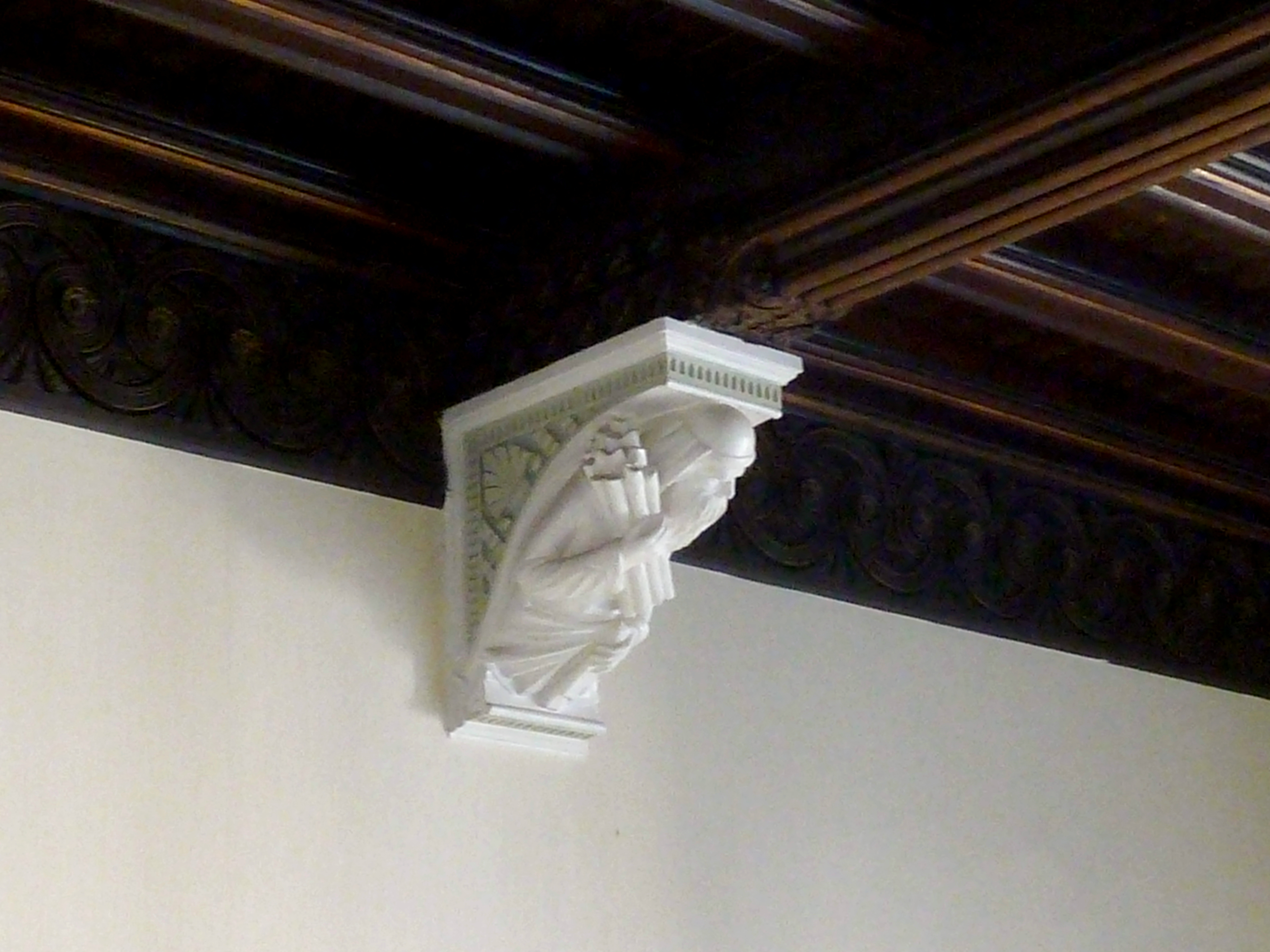
Corbel on grand staircase which may represent Barber

== Owners and residents ==
=== Owners and residents before 1871 ===
Richard Brodeley was Spring Hall's resident in 1614. Between 1649 and 1758, Joshua Wright owned the Hall. In 1761, Ben Hodgson, a yeoman, was living there. In 1847–1848 there was a case in the County Court disputing the will of merchant Joseph Bates the elder, a former resident of Spring Hall. The case was brought in the Prerogative Court of the Archbishopric of York by William Bates, son of Joseph Bates, against his brother Joseph Bates the younger and others.

=== Holdsworth family ===
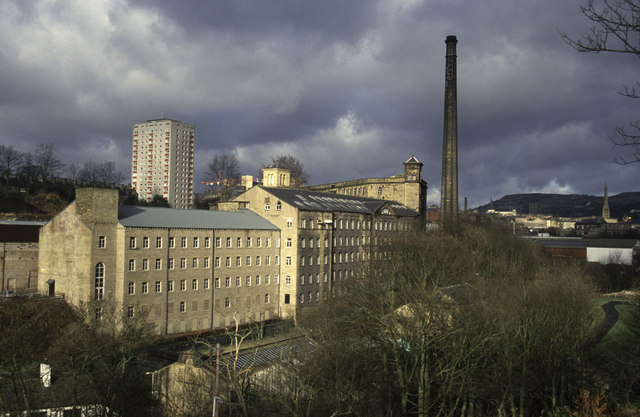
Shaw Lodge Mills

John Holdsworth (1797–1857), was a textile manufacturer and founder of John Holdsworth & Co Ltd, Halifax. The company has been based at Shaw Lodge Mills since 1822, and currently makes fabrics for seating on public transport. During his lifetime, John amassed extensive lands surrounding the mill. On his death these lands were divided for his four sons, and his third son Tom Holdsworth, who was born on 12 February 1826, inherited the portion which included the original Spring Hall building.

In 1858, freehold estate and "land and coal" at Spring Hall were included in a sale catalogue. John Foster bought land on the edge of Spring Hall estate, and this caused a problem when his planned Thornton-Bradford road threatened to impinge on Holdsworth's land.

In 1871 Tom Holdsworth rebuilt Spring Hall to the designs of Mallinson and Barber. With his three brothers he was a partner in the family business, but retired to Spring Hall in 1874 due to ill health. He mortgaged the property in 1875. In 1880 he added a greenhouse to Spring Hall. Tom died suddenly aged 56 on Sunday 1 May 1881, at the Great Northern Hotel near London King's Cross railway station. He is buried inside All Saints’ Church, Salterhebble. Tom's nephew, Captain Walter Holdsworth, JP (1851–1885), a partner in the business, inherited Spring Hall and retained it until his death, when he was interred alongside his uncle Tom in the family mausoleum at Salterhebble church. Walter's younger brother Clement (1855–1920) inherited the property but did not live there.

=== Later owners and tenants ===
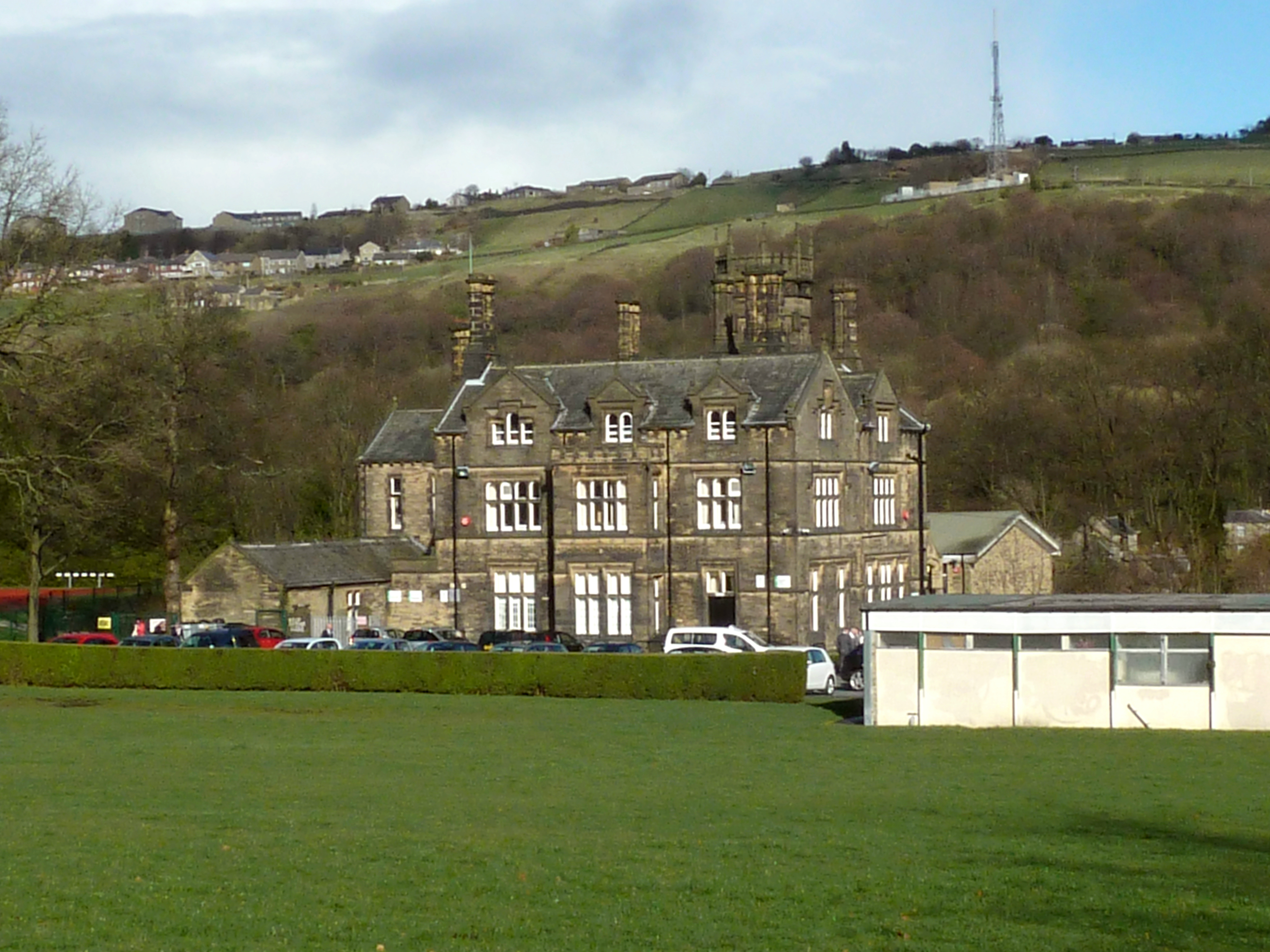
Hall with 1973 sports pavilion

The Midland Railway Company bought land adjoining the Hall in the 1890s, but did not use it. James Booth, JP, owned it by 1905; he was a hosiery manufacturer and owner of Lee Mills at Lee Bridge.

Between 1 February 1916 and 28 February 1918 the house, its annexe and the neighbouring Shaw Lodge were requisitioned as a "Convalescent and Auxiliary Hospital for injured servicemen, staffed by War and Voluntary Aid Detachment nurses." The number of patient beds varied from 84 to 220 during that time, and a total of 3,619 patients were treated.

Between 1919 and 1931 Spring Hall was a guest house for young men, owned by J. H. Whitley. It was put up for sale in 1928–1929, then between 1931 and 1938 the building was empty. It was purchased in 1938 by the Halifax knitting yarn firm of Patons and Baldwins. Between 1929 and 1940 the sports recreation ground was used for matches by Halifax Rovers Amateur Football Club. The Hall was requisitioned again in World War II. In 1948 Patons and Baldwins moved to Darlington, and Spring Hall was presented to Halifax Corporation. The Corporation used the land as a sports ground for schools, and in 1959 built the Percival N Whitley Memorial Sports Hall there. In 1973 two applications were made by B.A. Waddington, the borough architect, to build a sports pavilion in the grounds. Between 1942 and 1973, cricket matches between Halifax councillors and officials were played in the grounds. In 1977 and 1978, plans were submitted by the council for a new leisure centre in the grounds. Between 1947 and 1992, the Halifax branch of the National Council of Women Great Britain used the hall for meetings.

In 1990 the building was rented to The Northern Ballet Theatre Company for a short period. Half of the land became a running track with athletics facilities in 2007. Between 1990 and 2009, the building was neglected and eventually fell into disrepair, although the remaining grounds continued to be available for sports. Calderdale Register Office, whose address had been in Carlton Street, Halifax, since 1878, was removed to Spring Hall in April 2009.

== Recent history ==
In 2014 Ravenscliffe High School was awarded a grant of £113,882 by Sport England Inspired Facilities fund to build a sixth form and community centre in the former grounds of Spring Hall. As of April 2014, construction was expected to be completed by 2015.

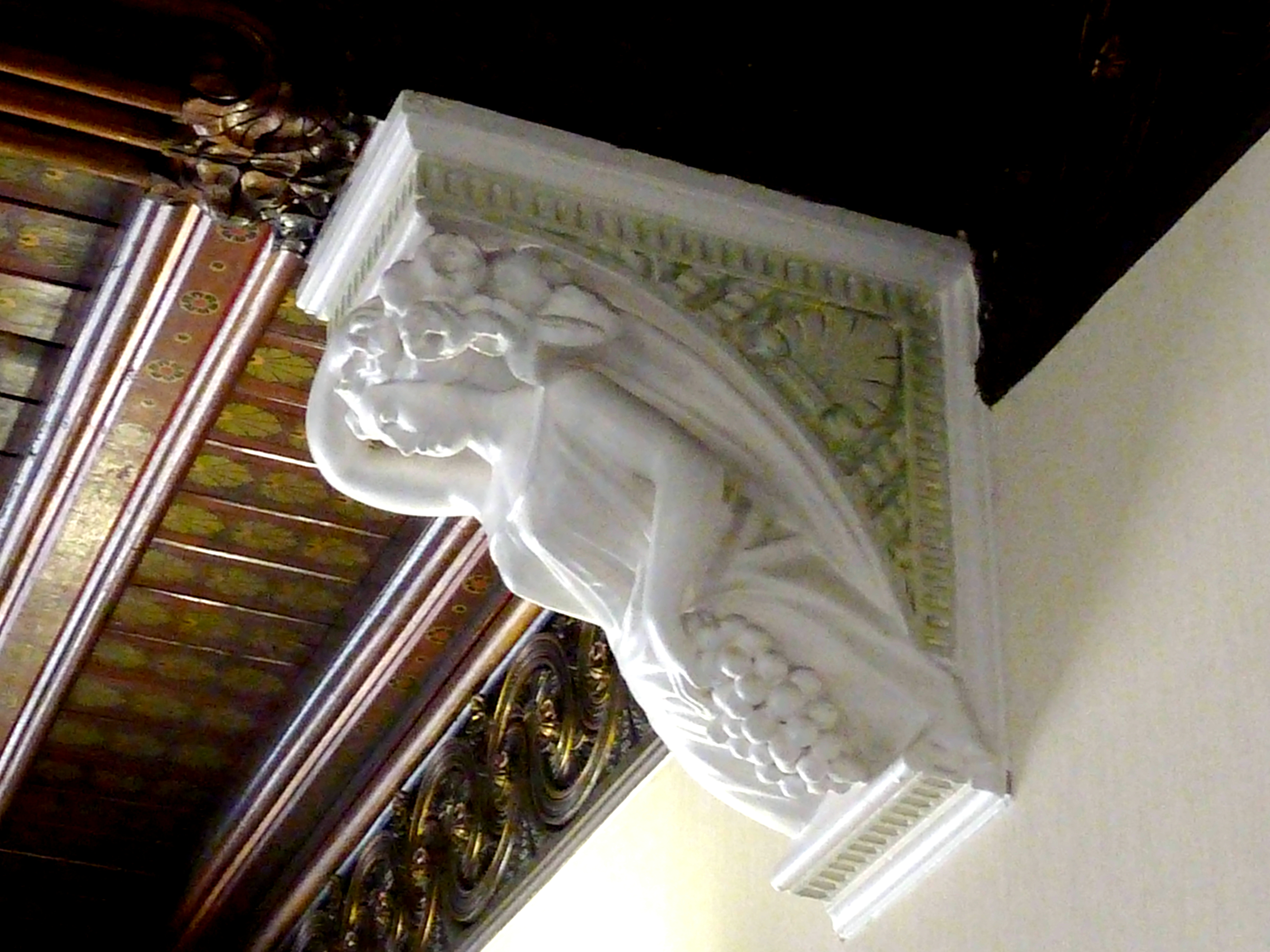
First floor ceiling corbel on grand staircase, showing stencilled and gilded wooden ceiling

== Bibliography ==
- Gregory, Barry (2006). A History of The Artists Rifles 1859–1947. Barnsley: Pen & Sword Books. ISBN 9781844155033.
