= Mortgage button =

Ornamental architectural feature

The "mortgage button" or "amity button" was a small ornamental inlay often featured on newel posts of a main staircase in the 19th and early 20th centuries, particularly in American and European homes. It was used to hide joinery.

The name comes from the historical misconception that they represented a homeowner who had paid off their mortgage. According to tradition, the homeowner would arrange to have a button made of ivory set onto the newel post when the house was paid off. Another version is that a scrimshaw maker would engrave the date the loan was paid off onto a piece of ivory, which was inserted the newel.

One popular myth was that the decorative cap was concealing a deed to the house, or a mortgage document, which had been rolled up and hidden inside the newel post. According to writer Mary Miley Theobald, no such documents have ever been found, although house plans were found inside the newel post on one occasion.

Others have suggested that the ivory button on the newel post was a symbol of cooperation or brotherly love.
