= Patons and Baldwins =

British yarn manufacturer

Patons and Baldwins Ltd
- Type: Private
- Industry: Clothing
- Founded: 1770s
- Founders: John Paton; James Baldwin
- Defunct: 1961
- Fate: Merged
- Successor: Coats plc
- Products: Yarn

Patons and Baldwins was a leading British manufacturer of knitting yarn. It was an original constituent of the FT 30 index of leading companies on the London Stock Exchange.

== Early history ==
The business began as two separate companies: J & J Baldwin and Partners, founded in the late 1770s by James Baldwin of Halifax, West Yorkshire, England, and John Paton Son and Co., founded in 1814 by John Paton of Alloa, Scotland. Both men had formed their businesses using the spinning mule developed by Samuel Crompton. They mainly produced yarns for commercial knitting machines.

The Paton family were regarded as generous benefactors in the town of Alloa, where they provided funding for a significant range of public building projects, including Alloa Town Hall, public libraries, a school, a swimming pool, and a gymnasium.

The two companies merged in 1920 and diversified into producing wool for home knitters, as well as publishing knitting patterns under the "Patons Rose" and "Baldwins Beehive" trademarks.

== Expansion ==
By the mid-1930s, the company had establishments across Scotland and Northern England, including factories at Billingham and Jarrow, as well as in Canada, New Zealand, and a large factory in Launceston, Tasmania, Australia. The company branched out into various related lines of business, including the running of an angora rabbit farm in Staffordshire between 1932 and 1934, and the development of new products such as nylon and Terylene.

In 1951, the headquarters of the business was relocated from Spring Hall, Halifax to a 140-acre site in Darlington, County Durham, where a single-storey factory employing 4,000 people was developed at a cost of £7.5 million. The factory had its own railway sidings and produced 113 tons of yarn every week.

== Demise of the business ==
In 1961, the company was merged with J & P Coats Ltd. The Patons trademark is still in use today. Ownership passed from Coats plc to Mez Crafts and then in 2020 to DMC.

The yarn production facility at Alloa was closed in 1999. The bulk of the surviving business records from the Alloa operation, together with some material from other factories, is now held by Clackmannanshire Archives in Alloa.

The large factory in Launceston, Tasmania, Australia, a 35-acre site, employed over 2,000 people in the 1960s. By 1982 the factory employed 604 people. The business was sold in the late 1980s; it passed through several owners until 1995 when it produced its last bail of yarn. The factory closed on 31 July 1997. In Australia the Patons brand is manufactured by Wangaratta Woollen Mills in Victoria, and has been a heritage Australian brand since 1923.

== Works football club in Tasmania ==
The factory in Tasmania operated the Patons & Baldwins Soccer Club, a football club that played in the local Northern Premier League. The club was state champion in 1926 and 1930, and won the Northern Premier League 10 times between 1925 and 1958. It was closed in the early 1960s.
