= List of Category A listed buildings in Clackmannanshire =

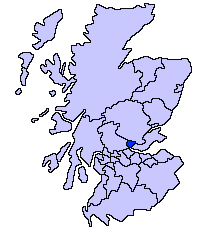
Clackmannanshire shown within Scotland

This is a list of Category A listed buildings in Clackmannanshire, Scotland.

In Scotland, the term listed building refers to a building or other structure officially designated as being of "special architectural or historic interest". Category A structures are those considered to be buildings of "national or international importance, either architecturally or historically". Listing was begun by a provision in the Town and Country Planning (Scotland) Act 1947, and the current legislative basis for listing is the Planning (Listed Buildings and Conservation Areas) (Scotland) Act 1997. The authority for listing rests with Historic Environment Scotland, an executive agency of the Scottish Government, which inherited this role from the Scottish Development Department in 1991. Once listed, severe restrictions are imposed on the modifications allowed to a building's structure or its fittings. Listed building consent must be obtained from local authorities prior to any alteration to such a structure. There are approximately 47,000 listed buildings in Scotland, of which around 8 percent (some 3,800) are Category A.

The council area of Clackmannanshire covers 159 square kilometres (61 sq mi), and has a population of around 50,000. Some 300 listed buildings are recorded in the Clackmannanshire Development Plan, of which 18 are Category A. These represent a variety of types and ages of structure. Listed structures range in size from William Henry Playfair's Greek-revival Dollar Academy, to the tiny Johnstone Mausoleum at Alva. Many of the earliest buildings, including the Old Kirk at Tullibody, and several late-medieval castles and tower houses, are now in ruins, although Alloa Tower is still habitable. Later dwellings include the 17th-century Menstrie Castle, 18th-century Brucefield, and 20th-century Gean House. The 19th-century cast iron bridge at Cambus is one of the earliest in Scotland. The textile mills and warehouse of the former Kilncraigs factory represent 20th-century heritage, and were restored in 2004.

== Listed buildings ==
Name	Location	Date listed	Geo-coordinates	Notes	LB number	Image
Clackmannan Tolbooth, Mercat Cross and Clackmannan Stone	Clackmannan	14 February 2017	56°06′26″N 3°45′09″W	Belfry tower, market cross and Mannan stone	1947	Upload another image See more images
Brucefield House	4.5 kilometres (2.8 mi) east of Clackmannan	12 June 1972	56°06′22″N 3°40′46″W	18th-century country house	1956	Upload Photo
Tullibody Old Bridge over the River Devon	Bridgend, by Tullibody	9 June 1960	56°08′06″N 3°51′28″W	Early 16th-century stone bridge	1977	Upload another image See more images
Sauchie Tower (or Devon Tower)	Sauchie	9 June 1960	56°08′33″N 3°46′33″W	Early 15th-century tower house	1980	Upload another image See more images
Iron bridge over the River Devon	Cambus, by Tullibody	12 June 1972	56°07′31″N 3°50′45″W	Early 19th-century cast-iron bridge	1985	Upload another image See more images
Menstrie Castle	Castle Court, Menstrie	9 June 1960	56°08′58″N 3°51′13″W	17th-century house	2025	Upload another image See more images
25 Kirkgate (Star House)	Kirkgate, Alloa	9 June 1960	56°06′46″N 3°47′32″W	Late 17th-century town house	20955	Upload Photo
Kilncraigs Mills (formerly Patons and Baldwins)	Greenside Street, Alloa	12 June 1972	56°06′52″N 3°47′21″W	Early 20th-century factory and offices	20956	Upload another image
Alloa Tower	Alloa	9 June 1960	56°06′46″N 3°47′20″W	15th-century tower house with later additions	20959	Upload another image See more images
Spiers Centre	Primrose Street and Primrose Place, Alloa	12 June 1972		Former public baths and gymnasium. Renamed for the boxer Tommy Spiers.	21009	Upload Photo
Gean House	Tullibody Road, Alloa	12 June 1972	56°07′30″N 3°48′44″W	Arts and Crafts house of 1911	21016	Upload another image See more images
Inglewood House	Tullibody Road, Alloa	12 June 1972	56°07′37″N 3°48′15″W	Jacobean style house of c.1900	21019	Upload Photo
Johnstone Mausoleum	Alva Churchyard, Alva	12 June 1972	56°09′27″N 3°47′45″W	1790 tomb designed by Robert and James Adam	21031	Upload another image
Dollar Academy	Dollar	9 June 1960	56°09′56″N 3°40′26″W	School built in 1820 by William Henry Playfair	24546	Upload another image See more images
Kilncraigs Despatch Warehouse	Greenside Street, Alloa	12 June 1972	56°06′46″N 3°47′26″W	1936 warehouse	49975	Upload another image

== See also ==
- Scheduled monuments in Clackmannanshire
