= Scheduled monuments in Clackmannanshire =

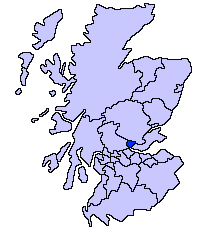
Clackmannanshire shown within Scotland

A scheduled monument in Scotland is a nationally important archaeological site or monument which is given legal protection by being placed on a list (or "schedule") maintained by Historic Environment Scotland. The aim of scheduling is to preserve the country's most significant sites and monuments as far as possible in the form in which they have been inherited.

The process of scheduling is governed by the Ancient Monuments and Archaeological Areas Act 1979, which aims "to make provision for the investigation, preservation and recording of matters of archaeological or historical interest". The term "scheduled monument" can apply to the whole range of archaeological sites which have been deliberately constructed by human activity but are not always visible above ground. They range from prehistoric standing stones and burial sites, through Roman remains and medieval structures such as castles and monasteries, to later structures such as industrial sites and buildings constructed for the World Wars. Some buildings or structures which were both scheduled and listed have had their listing designations removed to reduce the duplication.

As of 2010 there were 17 scheduled monuments in Clackmannanshire.

== Notable scheduled monuments in Clackmannanshire ==
Name	Location	Description	Ref No	Image
Tullibody Old Kirk	Tullibody	Ruined 12th-century church	SM626	
Sauchie Tower	Alloa	Medieval tower house	SM629	
Northern Glass Cone, Alloa Glass Works	Alloa	19th-century brick built structure	SM3746	
Castle Campbell	Dollar	Medieval castle	SM13611	
Kennetpans Distillery	Clackmannan	Remains of distillery	SM5012	
Clackmannan Tower	Clackmannan	14th-century tower-house	SM90073	

== See also ==
- List of Category A listed buildings in Clackmannanshire
