= County Buildings, Alloa =

County building in Alloa, Scotland

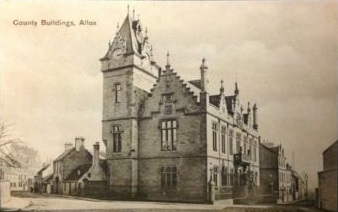
- County Buildings, Alloa

- Shown in Clackmannanshire
- 56.1160°N 3.7932°W
- Location: Drysdale Street, Alloa

History
- Built: 1865

Site notes
- Architect(s): Thomas Brown II and James Maitland Wardrop
- Architectural style: Scottish baronial style

Listed Building – Category B
- Official name: Alloa Sheriff Court and Justice of the Peace Court, including boundary walls and railings and excluding 2-storey and basement office block to east, Mar Street and Drysdale Street, Alloa
- Designated: 12 June 1972
- Reference no.: LB20970

County Buildings is a municipal structure in Drysdale Street, Alloa, Clackmannanshire, Scotland. The structure, which was the headquarters of Clackmannanshire County Council and is currently used as courthouse, is a Category B listed building.

== History ==
The first judicial building in the county was Clackmannan Tolbooth in Main Street in Clackmannan which dates from the 17th century. However, by the early 19th century, the tolbooth was in a dilapidated state. Court hearings were moved to the old Assembly Rooms in Alloa in 1822, which has since been demolished, before moving to Ochil House in 1842. This arrangement proved inadequate and, in the early 1860s, the Commissioners of Supply decided to commission a bespoke courthouse. The new building was designed by Thomas Brown II and James Maitland Wardrop of the firm of Brown & Wardrop in the Scottish baronial style, built in ashlar stone at a cost of £8,000 and was officially opened on 8 December 1865.

The design involved a symmetrical main frontage of seven bays facing onto Mar Street. The centre bay featured a doorway with a hood mould flanked by buttresses and brackets supporting a heavy balcony with corner piers enhanced by lions holding shields. There was a central tri-partite mullioned and transomed window on the first floor surmounted by a hood mould, a carved Royal coat of arms and a stepped gable with a lion rampant holding a weather vane at the apex. The wings were fenestrated with bi-partite or tri-partite mullioned and transomed windows on both floors, and at roof level, the wings were surmounted by a parapet, by stepped gables above the second and sixth bays and by finials. At the back of the building there was distinctive three-stage clock tower with a pyramid-shaped roof. Internally, the principal room was a double-height main courtroom.

Following the implementation of the Local Government (Scotland) Act 1889, which established county councils in every county, the new county leaders needed to identify a meeting place for Clackmannanshire County Council and duly decided to meet in the courthouse at Alloa. The complex was extended by two bays along Drysdale Street, to create a new police station, in 1910 and extended again, to enlarge the police station, in 1938.

After the abolition of Clackmannanshire County Council in 1975, the building continued to serve a judicial function, being used for hearings of the sheriff's court and, on one day a month, for hearings of the justice of the peace court.

== See also ==
- List of listed buildings in Alloa, Clackmannanshire
