= Catherine Bruce =

Catherine Bruce may refer to:

- Lady Catherine Bruce of Clackmannan (1696–1791), Scottish noblewoman
- Catherine Brudenell-Bruce (born 1984), English singer, also known as Bo Bruce
- Catherine Wolfe Bruce (1816–1900), American philanthropist
- Cathy Bruce (academic), Canadian academic and university administrator

== See also ==
- Kate Bruce (1860–1946), American actress
- Katharine Bruce Glasier (1867–1950), English politician
