= Cowden Park House =

Listed historic building in Alloa, Clackmannanshire, Scotland

Coordinates: 56.11860°N 3.80608°W

Cowden Park House is a house in Alloa, Clackmannanshire, Scotland. On 17 June 1977 it was listed as a Category C(s) historic building.

It was built in the 1850s for Alexander Forrester-Paton, a member of the family that owned the Patons and Baldwins wool company and large areas of land in Clackmannanshire.

The architect was John Melvin Sr. (1805 – 7 March 1884).

== See also ==
- Gean House
- List of listed buildings in Alloa, Clackmannanshire
