= List of listed buildings in Clackmannanshire =

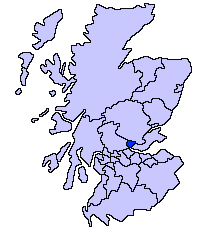
Clackmannanshire shown within Scotland

This is a list of listed buildings in Clackmannanshire. The list is split out by parish.

- List of listed buildings in Alloa, Clackmannanshire
- List of listed buildings in Alva, Clackmannanshire
- List of listed buildings in Clackmannan, Clackmannanshire
- List of listed buildings in Dollar, Clackmannanshire
- List of listed buildings in Muckhart, Clackmannanshire
- List of listed buildings in Tillicoultry, Clackmannanshire

== See also ==
- Scheduled monuments in Clackmannanshire
