= List of listed buildings in Clackmannan, Clackmannanshire =

This is a list of listed buildings in the parish of Clackmannan in Clackmannanshire, Scotland.

== List ==
Name	Location	Date Listed	Grid Ref. (Note: Sometimes known as OSGB36, the grid reference (where provided) is based on the British national grid reference system used by the Ordnance Survey. • "Guide to National Grid". Ordnance Survey. • "Get-a-map". Ordnance Survey.)	Geo-coordinates	Notes	LB Number (Note: Historic Environment Scotland assign a unique alphanumeric identifier to each designated site in Scotland, for listed buildings this always begins with "LB", for example "LB12345".)	Image
Kennet 1-20				56°05′57″N 3°43′34″W	Category B	1953	Upload Photo
Kilbagie Mill House (Personnel Dept Gestetner Papers Ltd)				56°05′28″N 3°43′26″W	Category C(S)	1957	Upload Photo
Clackmannan Tolbooth, Mercat Cross and Clackmannan Stone, Main Street, Clackmannan				56°06′26″N 3°45′09″W	Category A	1947	Upload another image See more images
Kennet House Lodge				56°06′13″N 3°44′18″W	Category B	1952	Upload Photo
Kennetpans				56°04′53″N 3°44′51″W	Category C(S)	1954	Upload Photo
Brucefield				56°06′24″N 3°40′46″W	Category A	1956	Upload Photo
Clackmannan Parish Church, High Street				56°06′25″N 3°45′16″W	Category B	1944	Upload Photo
2 And 2A Main Street And 1 Port Street (Flats 1, 2, 3 And 4), Former Royal Oak Hotel				56°06′25″N 3°45′09″W	Category B	1949	Upload Photo
Brucefield, Walled Garden				56°06′26″N 3°40′48″W	Category C(S)	14	Upload Photo
Bridge Over The Black Devon, Clackmannan, Including Wing Walls				56°06′41″N 3°44′55″W	Category C(S)	49852	Upload Photo
Clackmannan Manse Port Street				56°06′24″N 3°45′13″W	Category C(S)	1945	Upload Photo
Kilbagie House And Garden Walls				56°05′30″N 3°43′27″W	Category B	1955	Upload Photo
Hartshaw Farm				56°06′19″N 3°40′32″W	Category B	15	Upload Photo
Forest Mill, Weir				56°07′34″N 3°41′04″W	Category B	1959	Upload Photo
Clackmannan House				56°06′36″N 3°44′53″W	Category B	1950	Upload Photo
Brucefield Mains				56°06′27″N 3°40′49″W	Category B	13	Upload Photo
Aberdona House				56°08′11″N 3°41′44″W	Category C(S)	1958	Upload Photo
Hartshaw, Former Cornmill				56°06′17″N 3°40′30″W	Category C(S)	16	Upload Photo
Linn Mill, Westmost Cottage				56°07′02″N 3°43′44″W	Category C(S)	17	Upload Photo
Old Bridge Over Black Devon At Linn Mill				56°07′01″N 3°43′45″W	Category B	1960	Upload Photo

== Key ==
The scheme for classifying buildings in Scotland is:

- Category A: "buildings of national or international importance, either architectural or historic; or fine, little-altered examples of some particular period, style or building type."
- Category B: "buildings of regional or more than local importance; or major examples of some particular period, style or building type, which may have been altered."
- Category C: "buildings of local importance; lesser examples of any period, style, or building type, as originally constructed or moderately altered; and simple traditional buildings which group well with other listed buildings."

In March 2016 there were 47,288 listed buildings in Scotland. Of these, 8% were Category A, and 50% were Category B, with the remaining 42% being Category C.

== See also ==
- List of listed buildings in Clackmannanshire
