= List of listed buildings in Dollar, Clackmannanshire =

This is a list of listed buildings in the parish of Dollar in Clackmannanshire, Scotland.

== List ==
Name	Location	Date Listed	Grid Ref. (Note: Sometimes known as OSGB36, the grid reference (where provided) is based on the British national grid reference system used by the Ordnance Survey. • "Guide to National Grid". Ordnance Survey. • "Get-a-map". Ordnance Survey.)	Geo-coordinates	Notes	LB Number (Note: Historic Environment Scotland assign a unique alphanumeric identifier to each designated site in Scotland, for listed buildings this always begins with "LB", for example "LB12345".)	Image
27-53 Bridge Street				56°09′46″N 3°40′25″W	Category C(S)	24567	Upload Photo
6-14 Dewar Street				56°09′44″N 3°40′19″W	Category C(S)	24574	Upload Photo
4-8 Harviestoun Road (Charlotte Place)				56°09′46″N 3°40′41″W	Category C(S)	24579	Upload Photo
Woodcot, Back Road				56°09′52″N 3°41′07″W	Category B	24588	Upload Photo
36 And 38 High Street				56°10′02″N 3°40′04″W	Category C(S)	24598	Upload Photo
1 And 3 Hillfoot Road				56°10′02″N 3°40′12″W	Category B	24604	Upload Photo
19 Hillfoot Road (Broomieknowe Cottage)				56°10′04″N 3°40′08″W	Category B	24606	Upload Photo
27 Hillfoot Road (The Knowe)				56°10′06″N 3°40′05″W	Category B	24610	Upload Photo
2 East Burnside				56°09′49″N 3°40′15″W	Category C(S)	24526	Upload Photo
7 And 8 East Burnside (Oakbank)				56°09′53″N 3°40′16″W	Category C(S)	24531	Upload Photo
9 And 10 East Burnside				56°09′54″N 3°40′15″W	Category C(S)	24532	Upload Photo
South West Gates Facing Mcnabb Street Dollar Academy				56°09′50″N 3°40′30″W	Category C(S)	24547	Upload Photo
The Horseshoe				56°09′41″N 3°41′47″W	Category B	1934	Upload Photo
28-48 Bridge Street				56°09′47″N 3°40′22″W	Category C(S)	24558	Upload Photo
64 And 66 Bridge Street				56°09′46″N 3°40′30″W	Category C(S)	24560	Upload Photo
9 Mcnabb Street				56°09′47″N 3°40′28″W	Category C(S)	24571	Upload Photo
1 And 3 Devon Road				56°09′45″N 3°40′36″W	Category B	24577	Upload Photo
St James The Greater Church (Episcopal)				56°09′49″N 3°40′47″W	Category C(S)	24581	Upload another image See more images
14, 16, 18, 20 Back Road				56°09′59″N 3°40′35″W	Category B	24589	Upload Photo
1 Thorntonbank Road				56°09′55″N 3°40′55″W	Category C(S)	24590	Upload Photo
Castle Campbell Hall				56°10′00″N 3°40′15″W	Category C(S)	24591	Upload Photo
2 High Street (Burnside)				56°10′00″N 3°40′14″W	Category C(S)	24592	Upload Photo
34 High Street				56°10′02″N 3°40′05″W	Category C(S)	24597	Upload Photo
15 And 17 High Street				56°10′01″N 3°40′13″W	Category B	24600	Upload Photo
31 And 33 High Street				56°10′03″N 3°40′07″W	Category C(S)	24603	Upload Photo
2 Argyll Street				56°09′58″N 3°40′06″W	Category C(S)	24611	Upload Photo
1 And 3 Muckart Road (Gladstone Terrace)				56°09′49″N 3°40′05″W	Category C(S)	24616	Upload Photo
24 West Burnside (Burnside House)				56°09′55″N 3°40′18″W	Category B	24540	Upload Photo
6 Bridge Street				56°09′47″N 3°40′14″W	Category C(S)	24553	Upload Photo
10, 12 And 14 Bridge Street				56°09′47″N 3°40′18″W	Category C(S)	24555	Upload Photo
Strathdevon				56°09′48″N 3°41′25″W	Category C(S)	1928	Upload Photo
Drinking Fountain And Trough By Roadside At Broomrig				56°09′46″N 3°41′30″W	Category B	1929	Upload Photo
Broomrig				56°09′46″N 3°41′36″W	Category B	1930	Upload Photo
Bellmont				56°09′45″N 3°41′46″W	Category C(S)	1933	Upload Photo
Ochilton				56°09′37″N 3°40′35″W	Category B	1938	Upload Photo
Entrance Lodge, Dollarbeg				56°08′54″N 3°39′14″W	Category B	1940	Upload Photo
Faerwood Cottages (East And West)				56°09′49″N 3°41′15″W	Category B	1942	Upload Photo
50-62 Bridge Street				56°09′47″N 3°40′25″W	Category C(S)	24559	Upload Photo
5-23 Bridge Street				56°09′46″N 3°40′20″W	Category C(S)	24566	Upload Photo
61 Bridge Street				56°09′45″N 3°40′32″W	Category C(S)	24569	Upload Photo
3 Manor House Road (Ingleside)				56°09′50″N 3°40′27″W	Category C(S)	24573	Upload Photo
4 High Street				56°10′00″N 3°40′13″W	Category C(S)	24593	Upload Photo
8 High Street				56°10′01″N 3°40′12″W	Category C(S)	24595	Upload Photo
40 And 42 High Street (No.40 Baldinnes) (No.42 The Luggy)				56°10′03″N 3°40′03″W	Category C(S)	24599	Upload Photo
25 And 27 High Street				56°10′02″N 3°40′10″W	Category C(S)	24602	Upload Photo
Dollar Manse Manse Road				56°09′52″N 3°40′11″W	Category C(S)	24524	Upload Photo
1 East Burnside				56°09′48″N 3°40′15″W	Category C(S)	24525	Upload Photo
The Session House 3 And 4 East Burnside				56°09′51″N 3°40′15″W	Category B	24528	Upload Photo
11 East Burnside				56°09′55″N 3°40′15″W	Category C(S)	24533	Upload Photo
12 East Burnside (Glen Lodge)				56°09′56″N 3°40′16″W	Category C(S)	24534	Upload Photo
18 And 19 West Burnside				56°09′49″N 3°40′18″W	Category C(S)	24538	Upload Photo
Primary And Infant School Manor Park Road				56°09′51″N 3°40′23″W	Category C(S)	24543	Upload Photo
2,4,6 Academy Place				56°09′53″N 3°40′20″W	Category B	24552	Upload Photo
Bellville Cottage				56°09′44″N 3°41′40″W	Category C(S)	1931	Upload Photo
Mount Devon House Back Road				56°09′46″N 3°41′42″W	Category B	1932	Upload Photo
East Lodge				56°09′38″N 3°42′02″W	Category B	1935	Upload Photo
70 Bridge Street (Sycamore)				56°09′46″N 3°40′31″W	Category C(S)	24561	Upload Photo
86 Bridge Street				56°09′46″N 3°40′36″W	Category B	24562	Upload Photo
55-59 Bridge Street				56°09′45″N 3°40′30″W	Category C(S)	24568	Upload Photo
13 Mcnabb Street (Speedwell)				56°09′47″N 3°40′28″W	Category B	24572	Upload Photo
West Church Manse				56°09′43″N 3°40′40″W	Category C(S)	24576	Upload Photo
20 And 22 Harviestoun Road				56°09′49″N 3°40′54″W	Category C(S)	24585	Upload Photo
Seberham No.1 Bridge Street				56°09′47″N 3°40′08″W	Category B	24587	Upload Photo
32 High Street (South View)				56°10′02″N 3°40′06″W	Category C(S)	24596	Upload Photo
19 And 21 High Street				56°10′02″N 3°40′11″W	Category B	24601	Upload Photo
23 Hillfoot Road				56°10′05″N 3°40′07″W	Category C(S)	24608	Upload Photo
4 Argyll Street				56°09′59″N 3°40′06″W	Category C(S)	24612	Upload Photo
17 Sorley's Brae				56°09′59″N 3°40′09″W	Category C(S)	24615	Upload Photo
13 East Burnside				56°09′57″N 3°40′15″W	Category C(S)	24535	Upload Photo
Middle Bridge Over Dollar Burn, East And West Burnside				56°09′51″N 3°40′17″W	Category B	24541	Upload Photo
North Bridge Over Dollar Burn, High Street - Back Road				56°09′59″N 3°40′16″W	Category C(S)	24542	Upload Photo
1, 3, 5 Academy Place				56°09′52″N 3°40′19″W	Category B	24551	Upload Photo
Castle Campbell				56°10′30″N 3°40′29″W	Category A	1941	Upload another image
24, 26 And 28 Harviestoun Road				56°09′48″N 3°40′57″W	Category B	24586	Upload Photo
21 Hillfoot Road				56°10′05″N 3°40′08″W	Category C(S)	24607	Upload Photo
7 & 9 Muckart Road				56°09′50″N 3°40′01″W	Category C(S)	24617	Upload Photo
1 Manse Road, Keepers Cottage In Corner Of Graveyard				56°09′50″N 3°40′08″W	Category C(S)	24620	Upload Photo
Church Hall				56°09′50″N 3°40′15″W	Category C(S)	24527	Upload Photo
20, 21 And 22 West Burnside				56°09′50″N 3°40′18″W	Category C(S)	24539	Upload Photo
Dollar Academy				56°09′54″N 3°40′28″W	Category A	24546	Upload Photo
East Gates, Academy Place Dollar Academy				56°09′53″N 3°40′23″W	Category C(S)	24549	Upload Photo
Wester Sheardale				56°09′15″N 3°42′03″W	Category B	1936	Upload Photo
Springhill				56°09′49″N 3°41′13″W	Category C(S)	1943	Upload Photo
10 Sorley's Brae				56°09′57″N 3°40′11″W	Category C(S)	24613	Upload Photo
12, 14 And 16 Sorley's Brae				56°09′57″N 3°40′11″W	Category C(S)	24614	Upload Photo
4 Manse Road (Eastfield)				56°09′50″N 3°40′06″W	Category C(S)	24619	Upload Photo
Harviestoun Road, K6 Telephone Kiosk				56°09′48″N 3°40′49″W	Category B	24622	Upload Photo
Old Parish Church, Dollar And Adjoining Building At Churchyard Gate Within The Churchyard Of Present Parish Church				56°09′51″N 3°40′13″W	Category B	24523	Upload Photo
5 East Burnside				56°09′52″N 3°40′15″W	Category C(S)	24529	Upload Photo
6 East Burnside (Argyll Cottage)				56°09′53″N 3°40′15″W	Category B	24530	Upload another image
South East Gates Facing Cairnpark Street, Dollar Academy				56°09′51″N 3°40′25″W	Category C(S)	24550	Upload Photo
8 Bridge Street				56°09′47″N 3°40′14″W	Category B	24554	Upload Photo
16-24 Bridge Street				56°09′47″N 3°40′19″W	Category C(S)	24556	Upload Photo
26 Bridge Street (Homefield)				56°09′47″N 3°40′20″W	Category B	24557	Upload Photo
1 Mcnabb Street				56°09′49″N 3°40′29″W	Category C(S)	24570	Upload Photo
Dollar West Church				56°09′44″N 3°40′41″W	Category C(S)	24575	Upload Photo
10 Harviestoun Road				56°09′47″N 3°40′43″W	Category C(S)	24580	Upload Photo
Rectory 12 Harviestoun Road				56°09′48″N 3°40′44″W	Category B	24582	Upload Photo
18 Harviestoun Road				56°09′49″N 3°40′53″W	Category C(S)	24584	Upload Photo
2 Manse Road				56°09′50″N 3°40′06″W	Category C(S)	24618	Upload Photo
Bridge Street, K6 Telephone Kiosk				56°09′50″N 3°40′08″W	Category B	24621	Upload Photo
Parish Church Of St Columba, Dollar				56°09′49″N 3°40′11″W	Category B	24522	Upload Photo
17 West Burnside				56°09′49″N 3°40′18″W	Category C(S)	24537	Upload Photo
1 Chapel Place				56°09′51″N 3°40′18″W	Category C(S)	24544	Upload Photo
Birchgrove				56°09′47″N 3°41′22″W	Category C(S)	1927	Upload Photo
Clydesdale Bank Bridge Street				56°09′46″N 3°40′15″W	Category B	24563	Upload Photo
Castle Campbell Hotel				56°09′46″N 3°40′18″W	Category C(S)	24564	Upload Photo
13 Bridge Street				56°09′46″N 3°40′19″W	Category C(S)	24565	Upload Photo
2 Harviestoun Road				56°09′46″N 3°40′41″W	Category C(S)	24578	Upload Photo
14 And 16 Harviestoun Road				56°09′49″N 3°40′52″W	Category C(S)	24583	Upload Photo
6 High Street				56°10′00″N 3°40′12″W	Category C(S)	24594	Upload Photo
11 Hillfoot Road				56°10′04″N 3°40′10″W	Category C(S)	24605	Upload Photo
25 Hillfoot Road (The Broomieknowe)				56°10′06″N 3°40′06″W	Category B	24609	Upload Photo
14 East Burnside (Norwood)				56°09′58″N 3°40′15″W	Category C(S)	24536	Upload Photo
3 Chapel Place (Park House)				56°09′50″N 3°40′20″W	Category B	24545	Upload Photo
West Gates Facing Mylne Avenue Dollar Academy				56°09′52″N 3°40′36″W	Category C(S)	24548	Upload Photo
Devongrove Harviestoun Road				56°09′44″N 3°41′18″W	Category B	1937	Upload Photo
Dollarbeg				56°08′59″N 3°39′25″W	Category B	1939	Upload Photo

== Key ==
The scheme for classifying buildings in Scotland is:

- Category A: "buildings of national or international importance, either architectural or historic; or fine, little-altered examples of some particular period, style or building type."
- Category B: "buildings of regional or more than local importance; or major examples of some particular period, style or building type, which may have been altered."
- Category C: "buildings of local importance; lesser examples of any period, style, or building type, as originally constructed or moderately altered; and simple traditional buildings which group well with other listed buildings."

In March 2016 there were 47,288 listed buildings in Scotland. Of these, 8% were Category A, and 50% were Category B, with the remaining 42% being Category C.

== See also ==
- List of listed buildings in Clackmannanshire
