= List of listed buildings in Muckhart, Clackmannanshire =

This is a list of listed buildings in the parish of Muckhart in Clackmannanshire, Scotland.

== List ==
Name	Location	Date Listed	Grid Ref. (Note: Sometimes known as OSGB36, the grid reference (where provided) is based on the British national grid reference system used by the Ordnance Survey. • "Guide to National Grid". Ordnance Survey. • "Get-a-map". Ordnance Survey.)	Geo-coordinates	Notes	LB Number (Note: Historic Environment Scotland assign a unique alphanumeric identifier to each designated site in Scotland, for listed buildings this always begins with "LB", for example "LB12345".)	Image
Wester Pitgober, Farmhouse				56°09′47″N 3°39′26″W	Category C(S)	15253	Upload Photo
Pool Of Muckhart (South Side) Hillside Cottage				56°11′17″N 3°36′46″W	Category C(S)	15260	Upload Photo
Pool Of Muckhart Sea Mab				56°11′17″N 3°36′45″W	Category C(S)	15261	Upload Photo
Pool Of Muckhart (South Side) Bonaly Cottage And Downies Cottage				56°11′18″N 3°36′44″W	Category C(S)	15262	Upload Photo
Pool Of Muckhart, K6 Telephone Kiosk				56°11′20″N 3°36′40″W	Category B	15270	Upload Photo
Pool Of Muckhart Ivy Cottage And Ancrum				56°11′23″N 3°36′38″W	Category C(S)	19735	Upload Photo
Pool Of Muckhart Doune Cottage				56°11′23″N 3°36′37″W	Category C(S)	15239	Upload Photo
Pool Of Muckhart (North Side) Craigard				56°11′22″N 3°36′39″W	Category C(S)	15242	Upload Photo
Parish Church Of Muckhart, Graveyard				56°11′28″N 3°36′42″W	Category C(S)	15256	Upload Photo
Manse Of Muckhart				56°11′28″N 3°36′39″W	Category C(S)	15257	Upload Photo
Yetts Of Muckhart Ellaslea				56°11′42″N 3°36′21″W	Category B	15246	Upload Photo
Pool Of Muckhart Innerdownie Cottage & Hillview				56°11′19″N 3°36′44″W	Category C(S)	15241	Upload Photo
Muckhart Mill				56°10′10″N 3°37′28″W	Category B	15249	Upload Photo
Kellybank				56°10′00″N 3°39′46″W	Category B	15265	Upload Photo
Fragment Of Castleton House Cowden Castle				56°10′44″N 3°37′52″W	Category C(S)	15266	Upload Photo
Ardmill, Formerly Cowden Castle E. Lodge				56°10′54″N 3°37′38″W	Category C(S)	15268	Upload Photo
Tollhouse, Upper Yetts Of Muckhart				56°11′58″N 3°36′13″W	Category B	15243	Upload Photo
Muckhart Mill, House And Steading				56°10′11″N 3°37′27″W	Category B	15250	Upload Photo
Parish Church Of Muckhart				56°11′27″N 3°36′43″W	Category B	15255	Upload Photo
Balliliesk				56°11′37″N 3°36′36″W	Category C(S)	15258	Upload Photo
Muckhart Road, Kellyside				56°09′53″N 3°39′51″W	Category C(S)	50818	Upload Photo
Muckhart Mill, Limekiln				56°10′11″N 3°37′26″W	Category B	15251	Upload Photo
Burnbrae Lodge, Kellybridge, Near Dollar				56°09′51″N 3°39′54″W	Category C(S)	15264	Upload Photo
Middlehall				56°11′18″N 3°37′21″W	Category B	15269	Upload Photo
Pool Of Muckhart (North Side) The Inn				56°11′18″N 3°36′45″W	Category C(S)	15240	Upload Photo
Muckhart Mill, Bridge Over Hole Burn				56°10′11″N 3°37′28″W	Category C(S)	15252	Upload Photo
Pool Of Muckhart (South Side) Hollytree Lodge (Formerly Astral Villa)				56°11′15″N 3°36′45″W	Category C(S)	15259	Upload Photo
Kellybridge, Bridge				56°09′50″N 3°39′56″W	Category C(S)	15263	Upload Photo
Stable Arch, Cowden Castle				56°10′55″N 3°38′36″W	Category C(S)	15267	Upload Photo

== Key ==
The scheme for classifying buildings in Scotland is:

- Category A: "buildings of national or international importance, either architectural or historic; or fine, little-altered examples of some particular period, style or building type."
- Category B: "buildings of regional or more than local importance; or major examples of some particular period, style or building type, which may have been altered."
- Category C: "buildings of local importance; lesser examples of any period, style, or building type, as originally constructed or moderately altered; and simple traditional buildings which group well with other listed buildings."

In March 2016 there were 47,288 listed buildings in Scotland. Of these, 8% were Category A, and 50% were Category B, with the remaining 42% being Category C.

== See also ==
- List of listed buildings in Clackmannanshire
