= List of listed buildings in Alva, Clackmannanshire =

This is a list of listed buildings in the parish of Alva in Clackmannanshire, Scotland.

== List ==
Name	Location	Date Listed	Grid Ref. (Note: Sometimes known as OSGB36, the grid reference (where provided) is based on the British national grid reference system used by the Ordnance Survey. • "Guide to National Grid". Ordnance Survey. • "Get-a-map". Ordnance Survey.)	Geo-coordinates	Notes	LB Number (Note: Historic Environment Scotland assign a unique alphanumeric identifier to each designated site in Scotland, for listed buildings this always begins with "LB", for example "LB12345".)	Image
Cochrane Park Hall And Gates, West Stirling Street				56°09′12″N 3°48′33″W	Category C(S)	21033	Upload Photo
Island House, 16 Brook Street				56°09′22″N 3°47′57″W	Category C(S)	49221	Upload Photo
Dams, Farmhouse				56°09′09″N 3°50′14″W	Category B	2027	Upload Photo
48 Stirling Street, Johnstone Arms Hotel				56°09′12″N 3°47′55″W	Category B	21035	Upload Photo
Menstrie, Elmbank/Menstrie Mill				56°08′59″N 3°51′23″W	Category B	6228	Upload Photo
Balquharn Bride Over Balquharn Burn				56°09′17″N 3°49′29″W	Category C(S)	1993	Upload Photo
Menstrie Castle, 1-4 Castle Court				56°09′02″N 3°51′13″W	Category A	2025	Upload another image See more images
Brook Street Former Handloom Weaving Factory On Corner With Henry Street				56°09′07″N 3°47′53″W	Category B	21034	Upload Photo
Keverkae Bridge Over Balquharn Burn				56°09′16″N 3°49′30″W	Category C(S)	1994	Upload Photo
Alva Woodland Park, Icehouse				56°09′26″N 3°46′23″W	Category B	51095	Upload Photo
Alva-Johnstone Mausoleum, Alva Churchyard				56°09′20″N 3°47′32″W	Category A	21031	Upload another image
Ochil Road Bridge Over Menstrie Burn, Menstrie				56°09′08″N 3°51′15″W	Category B	2026	Upload another image See more images
Strude Mill, 6-Storey Warehouse Block				56°09′23″N 3°47′43″W	Category B	21032	Upload another image
Alva House, Stableblock And Cottage				56°09′28″N 3°46′22″W	Category B	1995	Upload Photo
West Stirling Street, Former Dalmore School Including Ancillary Building, Boundary Walls, Gatepiers, Gates And Railings				56°09′11″N 3°48′23″W	Category C(S)	51577	Upload Photo

== Key ==
The scheme for classifying buildings in Scotland is:

- Category A: "buildings of national or international importance, either architectural or historic; or fine, little-altered examples of some particular period, style or building type."
- Category B: "buildings of regional or more than local importance; or major examples of some particular period, style or building type, which may have been altered."
- Category C: "buildings of local importance; lesser examples of any period, style, or building type, as originally constructed or moderately altered; and simple traditional buildings which group well with other listed buildings."

In March 2016 there were 47,288 listed buildings in Scotland. Of these, 8% were Category A, and 50% were Category B, with the remaining 42% being Category C.

== See also ==
- List of listed buildings in Clackmannanshire
