= List of listed buildings in Alloa, Clackmannanshire =

This is a list of listed buildings in the parish of Alloa in Clackmannanshire, Scotland.

775881

== List ==
Name	Location	Date Listed	Grid Ref. (Note: Sometimes known as OSGB36, the grid reference (where provided) is based on the British national grid reference system used by the Ordnance Survey. • "Guide to National Grid". Ordnance Survey. • "Get-a-map". Ordnance Survey.)	Geo-coordinates	Notes	LB Number (Note: Historic Environment Scotland assign a unique alphanumeric identifier to each designated site in Scotland, for listed buildings this always begins with "LB", for example "LB12345".)	Image
Former Library And Museum Hall (Now Weir Pumps), Church Street				56°06′50″N 3°47′42″W	Category C(S)	20990	Upload Photo
11 Bedford Place Fenton House				56°06′50″N 3°47′51″W	Category B	20994	Upload Photo
4, 5 Grange Road				56°06′51″N 3°48′03″W	Category C(S)	21003	Upload Photo
Bedford Place, K6 Telephone Kiosk At Former General Post Office				56°06′48″N 3°47′41″W	Category B	21027	Upload another image
Ludgate, Alloa North Parish Church				56°07′06″N 3°47′50″W	Category B	21028	Upload another image See more images
6-10 (Even Nos) Mar Street, Hope Bakers, With Ovens				56°06′54″N 3°47′31″W	Category B	21030	Upload Photo
17, 19, 21 High Street Bank Of Scotland Building				56°06′55″N 3°47′29″W	Category B	20965	Upload Photo
13, 15 Mar Street Former Liberal Club				56°06′53″N 3°47′33″W	Category B	20967	Upload Photo
Ochil House Marshill And Mar Street				56°06′57″N 3°47′36″W	Category B	20975	Upload Photo
Dovecot, Near Auchinbaird Crossing Fishcross				56°08′05″N 3°46′28″W	Category B	1981	Upload Photo
Sauchie Parish Church New Sauchie				56°07′50″N 3°46′33″W	Category C(S)	1982	Upload Photo
12 Bedford Place Including Garden Walls And Gate				56°06′49″N 3°47′53″W	Category C(S)	20998	Upload Photo
Mercat Cross At 16 Bank Street				56°06′50″N 3°47′38″W	Category B	20987	Upload Photo
St Mungo's Parish Church Bedford Place				56°06′49″N 3°47′50″W	Category B	20997	Upload another image See more images
13 Grange Road				56°06′52″N 3°48′06″W	Category C(S)	21005	Upload Photo
Coach House Theatre, Tullibody Road, Former Inglewood East Lodge And Garage Block				56°07′26″N 3°48′14″W	Category B	21021	Upload another image
Alloa Old Kirkyard, Kirkgate				56°06′47″N 3°47′27″W	Category B	20954	Upload Photo
Gatepiers, Formerly Of Alloa House, Lime Tree Walk				56°06′40″N 3°47′39″W	Category B	20958	Upload another image
1, 3 Coalgate				56°06′51″N 3°47′32″W	Category C(S)	20962	Upload Photo
Bank Street Coalgate And Stripehead Former Gas Showroom				56°06′48″N 3°47′39″W	Category B	20982	Upload Photo
Former Social Security Offices, 16 Bank Street				56°06′51″N 3°47′38″W	Category C(S)	20986	Upload Photo
Tullibody Old Kirk				56°08′13″N 3°50′08″W	Category A	1972	Upload Photo
St. Serf's Church, Tullibody				56°08′15″N 3°50′07″W	Category B	1974	Upload another image See more images
Parkhead Road, Sauchie Hospital Lodge, Including Gatepiers And Boundary Walls				56°07′31″N 3°47′06″W	Category C(S)	49983	Upload Photo
Alloa West Church Bedford Place And Ludgate				56°06′50″N 3°47′47″W	Category C(S)	20993	Upload Photo
Stirling Road, Cowden Park				56°07′07″N 3°48′22″W	Category C(S)	21011	Upload Photo
The Gean House South Lodge				56°07′22″N 3°48′40″W	Category C(S)	21015	Upload Photo
Garden Walls Garden House, And Walled Garden West Of House, Carsebridge House				56°07′27″N 3°46′37″W	Category B	21023	Upload Photo
Napoleon Pillar Carsebridge House				56°07′26″N 3°46′34″W	Category B	21024	Upload Photo
St John's Episcopal Church Limetree Walk				56°06′46″N 3°47′37″W	Category B	20957	Upload another image See more images
41-45 Mill Street And 2 High Street				56°06′54″N 3°47′30″W	Category B	20963	Upload Photo
Former County Offices, 70 Drysdale Street				56°06′59″N 3°47′33″W	Category C(S)	20971	Upload Photo
9, 11 Bank Street Clydesdale Bank				56°06′50″N 3°47′34″W	Category C(S)	20979	Upload Photo
Tullibody Old Bridge, Over River Devon, Bridgend				56°08′06″N 3°51′27″W	Category A	1977	Upload another image See more images
Sauchie Tower (Or Devon Tower)				56°08′29″N 3°46′40″W	Category A	1980	Upload another image
Claremont, South African War Memorial				56°07′02″N 3°47′53″W	Category B	46269	Upload Photo
Sauchie, Fairfield Road (At Corner Of Mar Place), Sauchie War Memorial				56°07′33″N 3°47′02″W	Category B	49529	Upload another image
Sauchie, Fairfield Road (At Corner Of Mar Place), Sauchie Public Hall Including Boundary Wall To South And East				56°07′34″N 3°47′02″W	Category C(S)	49530	Upload Photo
Greenside Street, Kilncraigs Despatch Warehouse				56°06′46″N 3°47′24″W	Category A	49975	Upload Photo
21 Claremont, Claremont Grove Including Outbuildings, Summerhouse, Boundary Walls And Gatepiers And Garden Features				56°07′06″N 3°48′06″W	Category C(S)	50151	Upload Photo
Greenside Street, Elim Pentecostal Church (Formerly Greenside Mission Chapel)				56°06′48″N 3°47′28″W	Category C(S)	51623	Upload Photo
18-22 Bank Street				56°06′50″N 3°47′39″W	Category C(S)	20988	Upload Photo
War Memorial Gusset Of Bank Street And Church Street				56°06′49″N 3°47′42″W	Category B	20989	Upload another image See more images
Royal Oak Hotel And 3, 5 Bedford Place				56°06′49″N 3°47′45″W	Category C(S)	20991	Upload another image
13 Bedford Place Bedford House (Regional Council Offices)				56°06′50″N 3°47′54″W	Category B	20995	Upload Photo
16 And 16A Bedford Place, Westray				56°06′49″N 3°47′57″W	Category B	21000	Upload Photo
Northern Glass Cone, Alloa Glass Works, Glasshouse Loan				56°06′41″N 3°48′09″W	Category A	21008	Upload Photo
Primrose Street And Primrose Place, Former Public Baths And Gymnasium				56°07′01″N 3°47′31″W	Category B	21009	Upload Photo
Greenfield House (Now District Council Offices)				56°07′09″N 3°47′41″W	Category B	21010	Upload Photo
Claremont House, Claremont				56°07′12″N 3°48′17″W	Category C(S)	21014	Upload Photo
Carsebridge House, Carsebridge Road (Excluding Stables Built In 1911)				56°07′26″N 3°46′33″W	Category B	21022	Upload another image
19 Mar Street YMCA Building (Original Front House Block Only)				56°06′54″N 3°47′35″W	Category B	20968	Upload Photo
County And Police Buildings, Mar Street And Drysdale Street				56°06′58″N 3°47′36″W	Category B	20970	Upload another image
Mar Place House Mar Place				56°06′59″N 3°47′37″W	Category C(S)	20974	Upload Photo
25 And 27 Bank Street, 1, 3, 5, 7 And 9 Union Street, 2 And 12 Brewhouse Court, 20 And 22 Coalgate, Former Meadow Brewery And Union Club				56°06′50″N 3°47′37″W	Category B	20981	Upload Photo
Crown Hotel Bank Street				56°06′51″N 3°47′36″W	Category C(S)	20984	Upload Photo
Old Post Office And Savings Bank (Upper Floors Now Part Of Social Security Offices Etc) Bank Street				56°06′51″N 3°47′37″W	Category C(S)	20985	Upload Photo
Arnsbrae House Including Terrace				56°07′30″N 3°49′16″W	Category B	1967	Upload Photo
Lornshill, Farmhouse				56°07′50″N 3°49′13″W	Category B	1975	Upload Photo
Doocot, New Mills Crossing				56°07′50″N 3°51′05″W	Category B	1976	Upload another image See more images
King O'Muirs, Farm House				56°08′24″N 3°48′26″W	Category C(S)	1979	Upload Photo
Former St Mungo's Parish Hall, 10 Bedford Place, (1-8) St Mungo's Wynd Including Boundary Wall And Gatepiers				56°06′48″N 3°47′47″W	Category C(S)	49851	Upload Photo
17 Mar Street, Job Centre (Former Co-Operative Society Headquarters)				56°06′54″N 3°47′34″W	Category B	49859	Upload another image
9, 9A Bedford Place Old West Manse				56°06′49″N 3°47′47″W	Category B	20992	Upload Photo
33 Claremont				56°07′10″N 3°48′13″W	Category C(S)	21012	Upload Photo
Pavilion, Paton & Baldwin's Recreation Ground, Tullibody Road				56°07′18″N 3°48′11″W	Category B	21018	Upload Photo
Inglewood, Tullibody Road				56°07′35″N 3°48′14″W	Category A	21019	Upload Photo
Sunnyside Road, Alloa Co-Operative Sports Pavilion				56°07′14″N 3°47′24″W	Category B	21025	Upload Photo
Old Parish Church Of St Mungo, Alloa Old Kirkyard, Kirkgate				56°06′47″N 3°47′33″W	Category B	20952	Upload Photo
Mar And Kellie Mausoleum, Alloa, Old Kirkyard, Kirkgate				56°06′47″N 3°47′32″W	Category B	20953	Upload another image
Stable Block Of Former Alloa House				56°06′46″N 3°47′12″W	Category B	20960	Upload Photo
21 Mar Street				56°06′55″N 3°47′35″W	Category B	20969	Upload Photo
Moncrieff Uf Church Drysdale Street				56°07′00″N 3°47′35″W	Category C(S)	20973	Upload Photo
Marshill, Marchill House (Regional Offices)				56°06′59″N 3°47′46″W	Category C(S)	20977	Upload Photo
Former Chalmers Church, Bank Street Junction With Mill Street				56°06′52″N 3°47′36″W	Category B	20983	Upload Photo
Cross, Hawk Hill West Of Former East Lodge To Alloa House				56°06′50″N 3°46′06″W	Category B	1984	Upload Photo
Ludgate, Claremont Workshops, North Building (Former Ludgate Infant School) Including Boundary Walls, Railings, Gatepiers And Gate				56°06′58″N 3°47′52″W	Category C(S)	51392	Upload Photo
Former Alloa Burgh School (St Mungo's Infant Department) Bedford Place				56°06′47″N 3°47′44″W	Category C(S)	20996	Upload Photo
St John's Rectory, Grange Road				56°06′52″N 3°48′04″W	Category B	21004	Upload Photo
40, 40A Grange Road				56°06′53″N 3°48′14″W	Category C(S)	21006	Upload Photo
The Gean House, (Including Terraces, Forecourt, Walled Garden And Summerhouse), Tullibody Road And Claremont				56°07′31″N 3°48′43″W	Category A	21016	Upload another image
Inglewood West Lodge And Gates, Tullibody Road				56°07′27″N 3°48′16″W	Category B	21020	Upload Photo
East Vennel And Old Bridge Street, Thistle Brewery				56°06′54″N 3°47′22″W	Category B	21026	Upload Photo
Marshill, Marcelle (Regional Offices)				56°06′59″N 3°47′49″W	Category B	20978	Upload Photo
Arnsbrae House Stableblock				56°07′29″N 3°49′26″W	Category C(S)	1968	Upload Photo
Arnsbrae House Lodge				56°07′25″N 3°49′23″W	Category C(S)	1969	Upload Photo
3 And 3A Grange Road				56°06′51″N 3°48′01″W	Category C(S)	21002	Upload Photo
Grange Road, St John's Primary School (Former Grange School) Including Boundary Walls				56°06′59″N 3°48′21″W	Category B	21007	Upload Photo
35 Claremont, Craigmyle				56°07′10″N 3°48′14″W	Category C(S)	21013	Upload Photo
Gean House North Lodge To Tullibody Road				56°07′36″N 3°48′35″W	Category B	21017	Upload Photo
Dunmar House Hotel				56°07′33″N 3°49′02″W	Category B	21029	Upload Photo
Alloa Tower				56°06′45″N 3°47′18″W	Category A	20959	Upload another image
Moncrieff House 72 Drysdale Street				56°06′59″N 3°47′34″W	Category C(S)	20972	Upload Photo
Keilarsbrae House				56°07′29″N 3°46′46″W	Category C(S)	1983	Upload Photo
Greenside Street, Old Paton's Mill School				56°06′48″N 3°47′26″W	Category C(S)	51622	Upload Photo
14 Bedford Place				56°06′49″N 3°47′53″W	Category B	20999	Upload Photo
1, 1A And 2 Grange Road				56°06′51″N 3°47′59″W	Category C(S)	21001	Upload Photo
25 Kirkgate (Star House)				56°06′48″N 3°47′35″W	Category A	20955	Upload Photo
Greenside Street, Kilncraigs				56°06′48″N 3°47′24″W	Category A	20956	Upload another image
1,3 Mar Street And 31 Mill Street, Former Bank Of Scotland Building				56°06′53″N 3°47′32″W	Category B	20966	Upload Photo
Town Hall, Marshill				56°06′59″N 3°47′44″W	Category C(S)	20976	Upload another image See more images
19, 21, 23 Bank Street				56°06′50″N 3°47′36″W	Category B	20980	Upload Photo
Tullibody Old Kirkyard				56°08′13″N 3°50′08″W	Category B	1973	Upload another image
Iron Bridge Over River Devon At Cambus				56°07′32″N 3°50′47″W	Category A	1985	Upload another image See more images

== Key ==
The scheme for classifying buildings in Scotland is:

- Category A: "buildings of national or international importance, either architectural or historic; or fine, little-altered examples of some particular period, style or building type."
- Category B: "buildings of regional or more than local importance; or major examples of some particular period, style or building type, which may have been altered."
- Category C: "buildings of local importance; lesser examples of any period, style, or building type, as originally constructed or moderately altered; and simple traditional buildings which group well with other listed buildings."

In March 2016 there were 47,288 listed buildings in Scotland. Of these, 8% were Category A, and 50% were Category B, with the remaining 42% being Category C.

== See also ==
- List of listed buildings in Clackmannanshire
