= Clackmannan House =

House in Clackmannanshire, Scotland

Coordinates: 56°6′35.8″N 3°44′52.7″W

Clackmannan House, built c. 1815, is an example of Georgian design, stone built and nestled in a secluded setting amidst garden grounds of approximately 1.3 acres. It is a substantial family home with accommodation over three floors. The accommodation comprises a traditional Georgian entrance with large vestibule, expansive reception hallway with period curved staircase, and a formal drawing room reflective of the era.

It is a category B listed building.

== See also ==
- List of listed buildings in Clackmannan, Clackmannanshire
