= Schaw =

Schaw may refer to:

- Clan Schaw, a Scottish clan.
- William Schaw, (c. 1550 – 1602), Scottish, Master of Works to James VI, was an important figure in the development of freemasonry.
