= List of listed buildings in Tillicoultry, Clackmannanshire =

This is a list of listed buildings in the parish of Tillicoultry in Clackmannanshire, Scotland.

== List ==
Name	Location	Date Listed	Grid Ref. (Note: Sometimes known as OSGB36, the grid reference (where provided) is based on the British national grid reference system used by the Ordnance Survey. • "Guide to National Grid". Ordnance Survey. • "Get-a-map". Ordnance Survey.)	Geo-coordinates	Notes	LB Number (Note: Historic Environment Scotland assign a unique alphanumeric identifier to each designated site in Scotland, for listed buildings this always begins with "LB", for example "LB12345".)	Image
99 High Street, Former Municipal Buildings (Library)				56°09′12″N 3°44′38″W	Category C(S)	42051	Upload Photo
Tillicoultry House Stableblock				56°09′30″N 3°44′02″W	Category B	42053	Upload Photo
Harviestoun Castle Home Farm And To Adjoining Symmetrical Farmhouse Buildings				56°09′43″N 3°43′01″W	Category B	13856	Upload Photo
Tillicoultry Manse				56°09′07″N 3°44′05″W	Category C(S)	42049	Upload Photo
Shannockhill Farmhouse				56°08′17″N 3°43′26″W	Category C(S)	19727	Upload Photo
Tillicoultry, Moss Road, Devonvale Hall, Including Gatepiers				56°09′03″N 3°44′18″W	Category B	50034	Upload Photo
Upper Mill Street Clock Mill				56°09′27″N 3°44′58″W	Category B	42054	Upload Photo
Beechwood, Dollar Road				56°09′12″N 3°44′11″W	Category B	42057	Upload Photo
Devonknowes Farmhouse				56°08′47″N 3°43′18″W	Category C(S)	15204	Upload Photo
Tower Of Former Popular Institute Ochil Street				56°09′18″N 3°44′44″W	Category B	42050	Upload Photo
Tillicoultry Lower Mill Street, 15-77 (Odd Nos) Weavers Way, (Former J And D Paton's Woollen Mill)				56°09′10″N 3°44′56″W	Category B	42058	Upload Photo
Parish Church Of St. Serf, Tillicoultry				56°09′12″N 3°44′11″W	Category B	42048	Upload Photo
High Street, Former West Church				56°09′12″N 3°44′42″W	Category C(S)	42052	Upload Photo
Harviestoun Castle, Stableblock				56°09′42″N 3°43′02″W	Category B	15205	Upload Photo
Old Churchyard. Tillicoultry House				56°09′31″N 3°44′03″W	Category B	42056	Upload Photo
Tillicoultry Mains, Steading				56°09′25″N 3°43′39″W	Category B	15165	Upload Photo
Bridge Over Tillicoultry Burn At Clock Mill				56°09′27″N 3°44′58″W	Category B	42055	Upload Photo

== Key ==
The scheme for classifying buildings in Scotland is:

- Category A: "buildings of national or international importance, either architectural or historic; or fine, little-altered examples of some particular period, style or building type."
- Category B: "buildings of regional or more than local importance; or major examples of some particular period, style or building type, which may have been altered."
- Category C: "buildings of local importance; lesser examples of any period, style, or building type, as originally constructed or moderately altered; and simple traditional buildings which group well with other listed buildings."

In March 2016 there were 47,288 listed buildings in Scotland. Of these, 8% were Category A, and 50% were Category B, with the remaining 42% being Category C.

== See also ==
- List of listed buildings in Clackmannanshire
