= Clan Schaw =

Scottish clan

Arms of Schaw of Sauchie.

Clan Schaw is a Lowland Scottish clan. Clan Schaw does not have a chief recognised by the Lord Lyon King of Arms, therefore the clan has no standing under Scots Law. Clan Schaw is an armigerous clan, meaning that it had at one time a chief who possessed the chiefly arms, however no one at present is in possession of such arms.

The clan has no connection with the similarly named Clan Shaw of Tordarroch (commonly known as Clan Shaw) which is one of the Highland clans of the Clan Chattan Confederation.

== Uncertain origins ==
In George Crawfurd's 18th century publication, History of Renfrewshire, he stated that the antiquary Sir George Mackenzie claimed the clan descended from "Shiach, a son of MacDuff Earl of Fife" from whom the clan took its name. It has also been said the clan descends from a second son of Duncan, Earl of Fife, who was cup bearer to the king of Scots. Later, the 18th century heraldist Alexander Nisbet claimed that the clan may have acted as cup bearers to Alexander II or Alexander III. There is however no real evidence to support any of these claims. Despite this, the arms of Schaw of Sauchie (the principal branch of the clan) allude to the office of cup bearer, and are blazoned as: Azure, three covered cups Or. In this way the arms are similar to those of the Butler family in England. Today members of Clan Schaw may wear a crest badge to show their allegiance to the clan. This crest badge contains the heraldic crest a demi savage Proper, and the heraldic motto I MEAN WELL. The crest within the crest badge is derived from the arms of Schaw of Sauchie.

== History ==
The clan name Schaw is either a topographic name or a habitational name. The topographic name is for person who lived near a copse or thicket. It is derived from the Middle English s(c)hage, s(c)hawe from the Old English sceaga. The habitational name could be derived from several places named with these words. The earliest record of the lowland name is of John de Schau, who witnessed a deed in relation to the Abbey of Paisley in 1284. Another early recorded Schaw is William Schaw who witnessed a charter in 1291 to the Monastery of Paisley. In 1296, Symon de Schawe, Fergus de Shawe and William de Schawe of Lanark, all rendered homage to Edward I, king of England.

Sometime before 1309, the clan acquired the lands of Hayley, Wardlaw and Drumchaber in Ayr from James, Great Steward of Scotland. In 1407, an agreement between John Schaw, lord of Hayley and Alan Cathcart was confirmed by charter under the great seal. John Schaw of Hayley was one of the men who made up the Embassy that negotiated the terms of marriage between James III and Margaret, daughter of the Christian I, king of Denmark. In 1477, a younger son of John Schaw of Hayley received the lands of Sornbeg and Polkemmet. The principal family within the clan was said to have been the Schaws of Sauchie (their residence, Sauchie Tower still stands in Clackmannanshire). A member of this family was John Schaw of Sauchie, who was Comptroller of the Royal Household to James III. Other branches or families within the clan were located in Kirkcudbrightshire and Ayrshire, and also around the towns of Greenock and Stirling.

== See also ==
- Schaw, disambiguation page
