= Clackmannan Tolbooth =

Municipal building in Clackmannan, Scotland

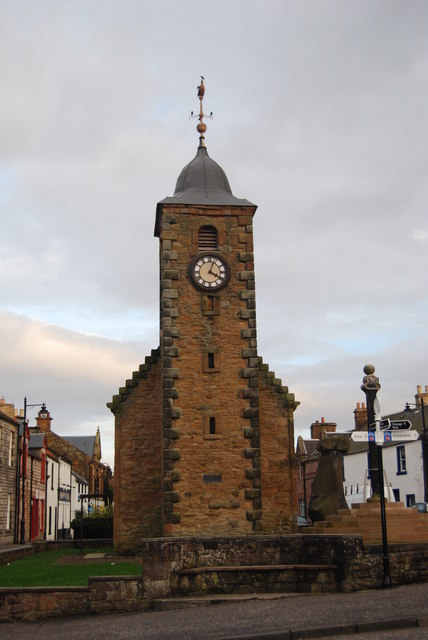
- The building in 2008

- Shown in Clackmannanshire
- 56.1073°N 3.7524°W
- Location: Main Street, Clackmannan

History
- Built: 1680

Site notes
- Architectural style: Scottish medieval style

Listed Building – Category A
- Official name: Clackmannan Tolbooth, Mercat Cross and Clackmannan Stone, Main Street, Clackmannan
- Designated: 9 June 1960
- Reference no.: LB1947

Clackmannan Tolbooth is a former municipal building on Main Street in Clackmannan in Clackmannanshire in Scotland. The building, of which only the clock tower survives, is a Category A listed building.

== History ==
The building was commissioned by the sheriff of Clackmannan, Sir William Menteith, who had previously been required to hold court hearings in the open air and to keep prisoners in his own house. The erection of the tolbooth was authorised by Act of Parliament, and the site he selected was at the west end of Main Street adjacent to the ancient mercat cross.

The tolbooth was designed in the Scottish medieval style, built in rubble masonry and completed in 1592. The original design involved a rectangular main block facing onto Main Street with stepped gables at either end. A five-stage tower was added to the west end of the main block in 1680. The first four stages contained small rectangular openings while the fifth stage contained a round headed opening with louvres. A clock was installed at the top of tower and the whole structure was surmounted by an ogee-shaped roof and a weather vane. A bell, donated by Sir Lawrence Dundas, was installed in the tower in 1765.

The building served as the county courthouse for Clackmannanshire and, although very dilapidated by the early 19th century, it continued to operate in that role until hearings were transferred to the old Assembly Rooms in Alloa in 1822. The main block was subsequently demolished leaving just the clock tower and the stepped gable end standing. A whinstone boulder, known as King Robert's Stone or the Clackmannan Stone, which had originated from Lookaboutye Brae (just to the south of Clackmannan) and had been preserved in Clackmannan Tower for many centuries, was placed on top of a pedestal to the immediate south of the tolbooth in 1833.

The surviving tower remained a local landmark and the bell at the top of the tower continued to be rung every evening until 1939. However, by the early 21st century, the tower had become dilapidated. An inspection, carried out in December 2022, identified that remedial repairs were urgently needed. A major programme of restoration works, involving restoration of the stonework, the bell, the clock and the weather vane, was carried out at a cost of approximately £400,000 in summer 2024. The work was financed by grants from Clackmannanshire Council and Historic Environment Scotland.

== See also ==
- List of Category A listed buildings in Clackmannanshire
- List of listed buildings in Clackmannan, Clackmannanshire
