= Catherine Bruce of Clackmannan =

Scottish noblewoman and Jacobite

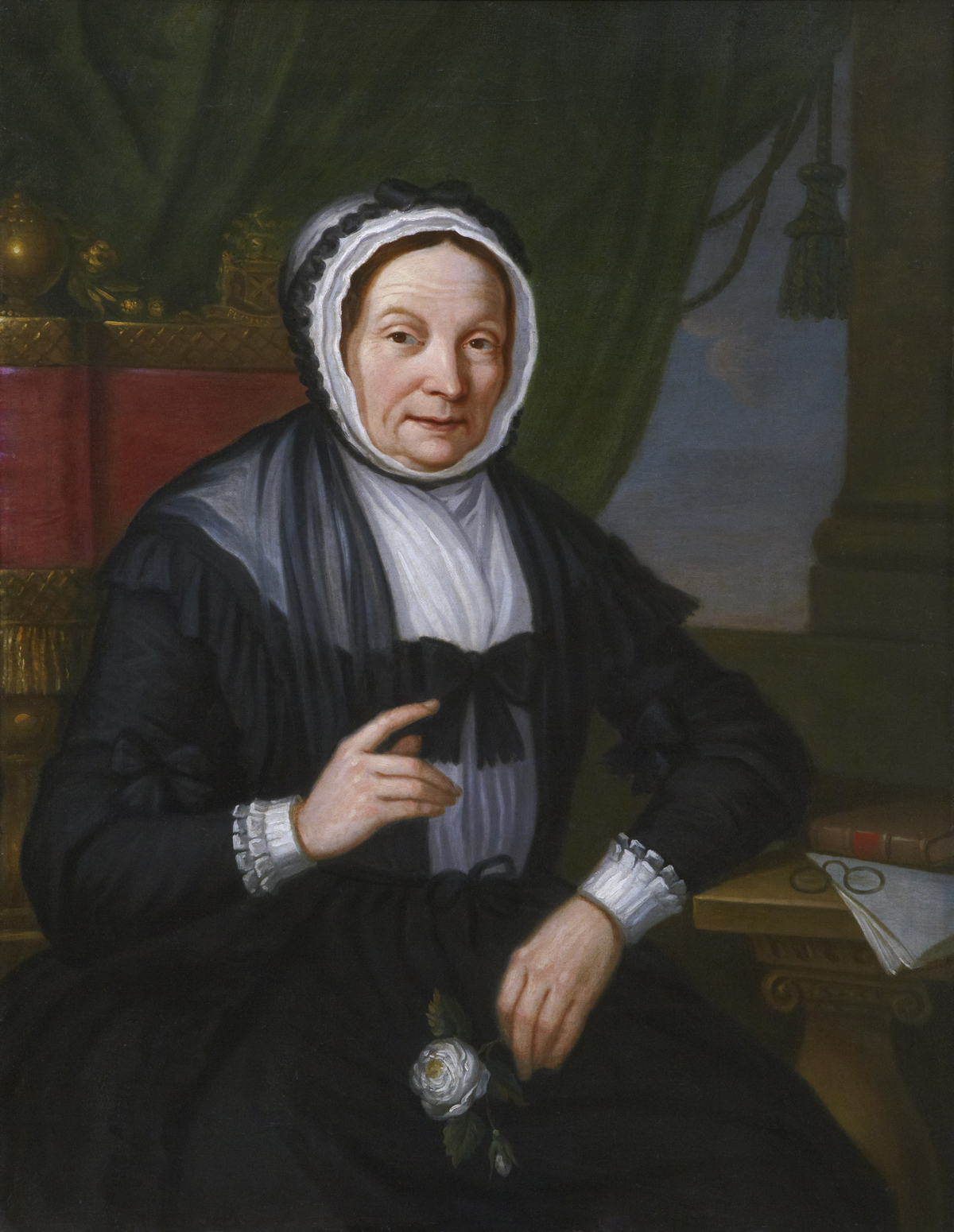
Catherine Bruce of Clackmannan by (school of) David Allan owned by Clackmannanshire Council

Catherine Bruce of Clackmannan (1696–1791) was a Scottish noblewoman and Jacobite. She is remembered for unofficially knighting notable people including the poet Robert Burns.

== Jacobitism ==
Bruce lived in Clackmannan Tower in Clackmannanshire in Scotland. Her husband Henry Bruce fought for the Jacobites against the English crown in the 1745 uprising, and she herself supported the movement.

== Descent from Robert the Bruce ==
Catherine was known for her eccentricity and had many eclectic visitors at Clackmannan Tower. In 1787 she was visited by the celebrated Scottish poet, Robert Burns, and she "knighted" him with a family sword said to have once belonged to Robert the Bruce, King of Scotland (1306–1329) and from whom she and her husband both claimed descent. Burns's companion Dr Adair described Catherine as: 'Though almost deprived of speech by a paralytic affection, she preserved her hospitality and urbanity.' She is believed to have said during the ceremony that she 'had a better right to confer that title [knighthood] than some people' implying that the current Hanoverian monarchs were illegitimate. She (unofficially) knighted other select guests across the years with the same sword including Dr John Jamieson, editor of the Scots Dictionary. On her death, the sword passed to the Earl of Elgin, and in 2018 went on public display for the first time courtesy of the Broomhall Estate.

== Death and legacy ==
She died in 1791. Her life's story was included in the Walking Theatre Company's production of Tales of Clackmannan which celebrated the history of Clackmannanshire.

She has a Scottish country dancing reel named after her called Lady Catherine Bruce's Reel. Clackmannanshire Council owns a painting of her which is attributed the school of the Scottish painter David Allan.
