= Gean House =

House in Alloa, Clackmannanshire, Scotland

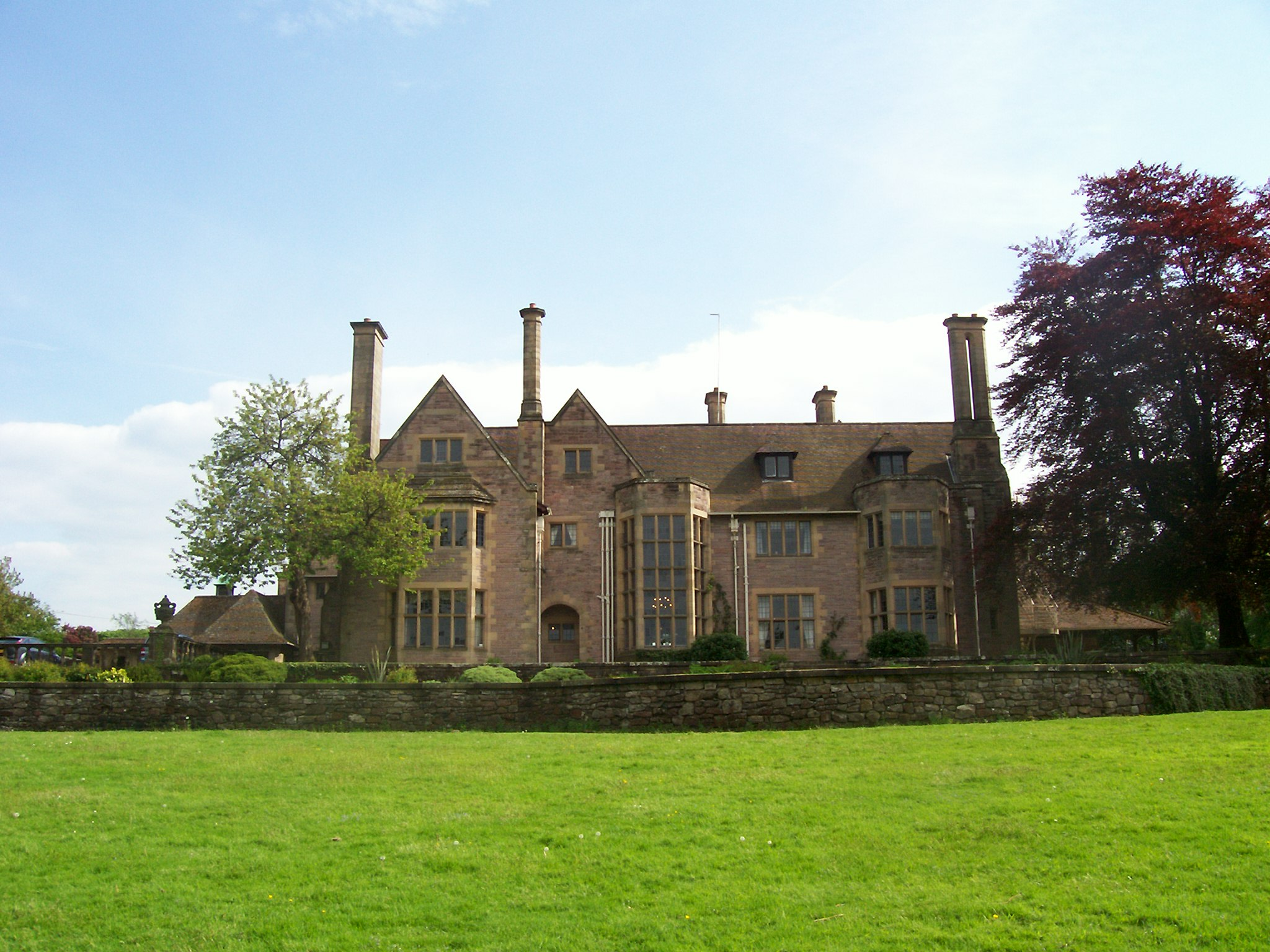
Gean House, 2008

Gean House, or The Gean, is an early 20th-century Arts and Crafts style mansion, located on Tullibody Road, Alloa, Scotland. It was owned and used as a venue for events but has now been restored to a private residence since October 2018.

== Background ==
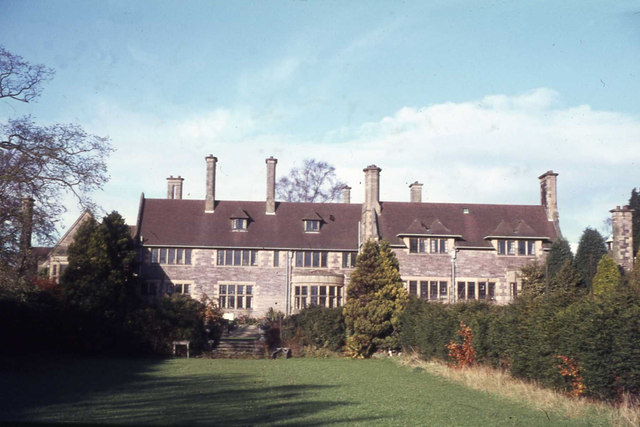
Gean House, 1970

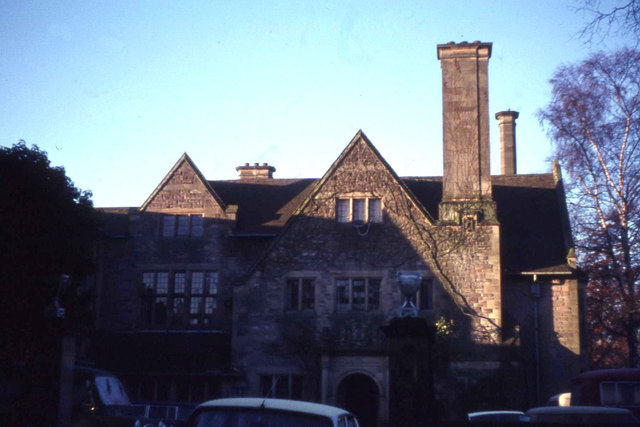
Gean House, 1970

In November 1911, Alexander Forrester-Paton, of Inglewood House, Alloa, purchased 30 acres (12 ha) of land from the Earl of Mar and Kellie, for £6,220. His intention was to "erect and complete in a satisfactory manner a Mansion House and relative Offices."

Alexander Forrester-Paton was the managing director of the Alloa-based firm of Patons, the family business founded by his grandfather to manufacture woollen yarn. Some 16 years earlier, Alexander had purchased land from the Earl to build his own family home at nearby Inglewood. Alexander Forrester-Paton also owned large estates in Clackmannanshire, and built several other buildings, such as Cowdenpark, where he lived.

Gean House was to be built as a wedding gift for Alexander's eldest son, also named Alexander, who worked in the family business. Plans were commissioned from William Kerr (1866–1940), partner in the local firm of John Melvin & Sons, an architect previously engaged to design Patons' headquarters at Kilncraigs in Alloa.

The Gean House commission was not confined to the erection of one building. Kerr's task was to design and construct a mini-estate, including north, south and east lodges, a walled garden, glasshouses and a garage.

== Transport to Gean House ==
There are many paths going into forests all around the Gean House and can get right up to its fences. There is also a road that drives past the Gean House and there is various sub roads going up to the gean.

== A contemporary design ==
Completed in 1912, Kerr's design for Gean was greatly influenced by the work of English architect, Edwin Lutyens (1869–1944). Lutyen's early work marked the transition from the authoritative and imposing Victorian country house style to the softer, Arts and Crafts style of the Edwardian era, that sought to integrate houses and gardens into the landscape. There are therefore striking differences between the late Victorian design of Inglewood and the romantic, retro style chosen for Gean, despite being built only 12 years later.

Gean House bears all the hallmarks of Lutyen's romantic approach, deploying traditional materials and extensive planting. The steep roofs, tall chimneystacks and side entranceway at Gean are all notable Lutyen's features, as interpreted by Kerr. The design of Gean also reflects the prevalent changes in social and economic conditions. As jobs in factories and offices increasingly offered better pay, fewer hours and more independence, suitable domestic staff were becoming difficult to find. Servants therefore had to be tempted to work in country houses by ensuring that they were less arduous to run and offered improved standards of staff accommodation.

Modern, labour-saving, technology was therefore enthusiastically embraced at Gean including central heating, gas ignition coal fires and electric lighting. The service wing was designed to be very much part of the main house, with attractive, south facing, staff bedrooms overlooking the principal gardens. Only the higher sill levels of the service wing windows distinguish this section of the house.

Despite its modernity, Gean House incorporates many features to be found in country houses of earlier periods: the grand hall, complete with minstrels' gallery, the timber-panelled dining room, the drawing room, the library and the billiard room. Inglenook fireplaces form a decorative feature throughout Gean, and a practical means of retaining fireside heat. Conservatories were no longer fashionable in Edwardian Britain, but loggias and Japanese-style gardens were very much in vogue and incorporated into the grand plan. A local firm, Robert Cairns of Alloa, was engaged to build Kerr's design. Gean House functioned as an affluent family home for fewer than 40 years.

== After the Patons ==
Gean remained a Paton family residence until 1951, when it was donated to the Scottish Temperance Alliance for use as a conference and study centre. During the 1970s, both the north and south lodges and a policy field were sold off, and much of the parkland given to the local council. Despite raising money by dismembering the estate, the registered owners, The Gean House (Scottish Temperance Alliance) Limited, went into liquidation in 1979.

The house was sold to Donald Aarons, a Melbourne-based businessman in 1982, but remained boarded up and abandoned for a further seven years until it found new owners with ambitions to turn the house into an exclusive private hotel. A considerable investment was made in 1989 to partially restore the building and redress years of neglect. However, within a few years, the hotel business failed.

In 1999, Gean House was bought by an Alloa-based trust company, now known as Ceteris. The company fully restored the property as a venue for a wide range of business and social events. In October 2018, the property was purchased by local businessman and chairman of Alloa Athletic football club, Mike Mulraney. It was subsequently turned back into a private residence and is currently under further modernisation and restoration. Gean House is a category A listed building.
