= Clackmannan Tower =

- Tùr Chlach Mhanainn
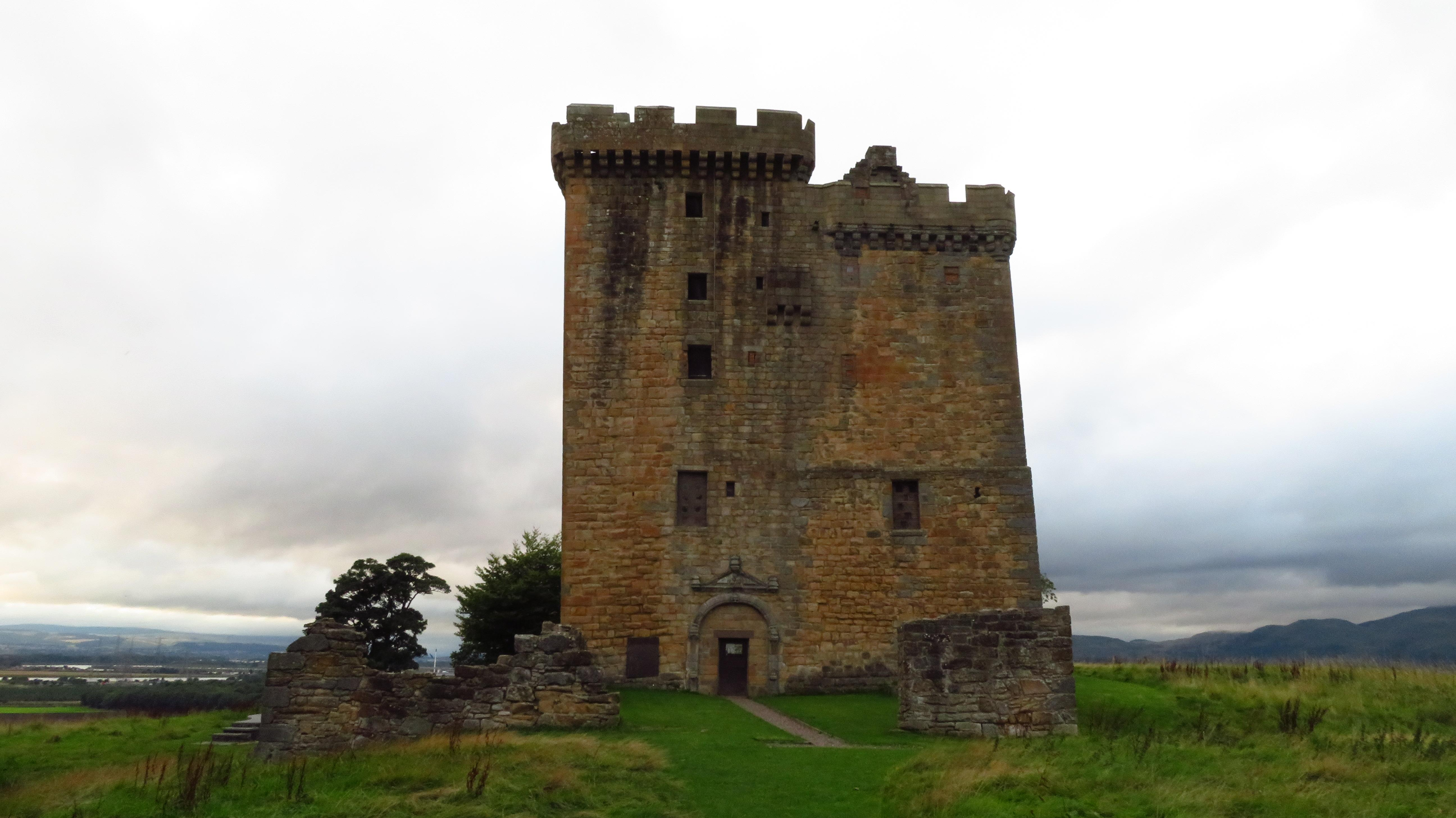
- The tower in 2021

General information
- Status: Scheduled monument
- Architectural style: Medieval
- Location: Clackmannan, Clackmannanshire, Scotland, High St, Clackmannan FK10 4HR
- Coordinates: 56°06′26″N 3°45′34″W
- Completed: 14th Century
- Owner: Scottish Heritage Trust

Technical details
- Floor count: 5

Scheduled monument
- Official name: Clackmannan Tower
- Type: Secular: castle
- Designated: 30 June 1921
- Reference no.: SM90073

The Clackmannan Tower is a historic five-storey tower house situated at the summit of King's Seat Hill in Clackmannan, Clackmannanshire, Scotland. It dates back to at least the 14th century when it was inhabited by King David II of Scotland and later sold to his cousin Robert Bruce, 2nd Baron of Clackmannan in 1359.

== History ==
Clackmannan Tower is a historic structure with a rich history. It served as a residence for King David II of Scotland during the 14th century. In 1359, King David II sold the tower to his cousin, Robert Bruce, 2nd Baron of Clackmannan. The first tower was finished around 1365, and the second, taller extension was built during the 1400s. The tower has since been recognized as a designated scheduled monument.

The eccentric Catherine Bruce of Clackmannan (1696–1791) lived here. Her husband Henry Bruce fought for the Jacobites against the English crown in the 1745 uprising, and she herself supported the movement.

== Architecture ==
The tower is a five-storey structure built in the tower house style. It is located at the summit of King's Seat Hill, providing scenic views of the surrounding area. The exact construction date of the tower is not known, but it is believed to have been constructed in the 14th century.

== Preservation ==
Clackmannan Tower is a well-preserved historic monument. Its designation as a scheduled monument ensures its protection and conservation for future generations to appreciate.
