= Sauchie Tower =

Coordinates: 56°08′28″N 3°46′40″W

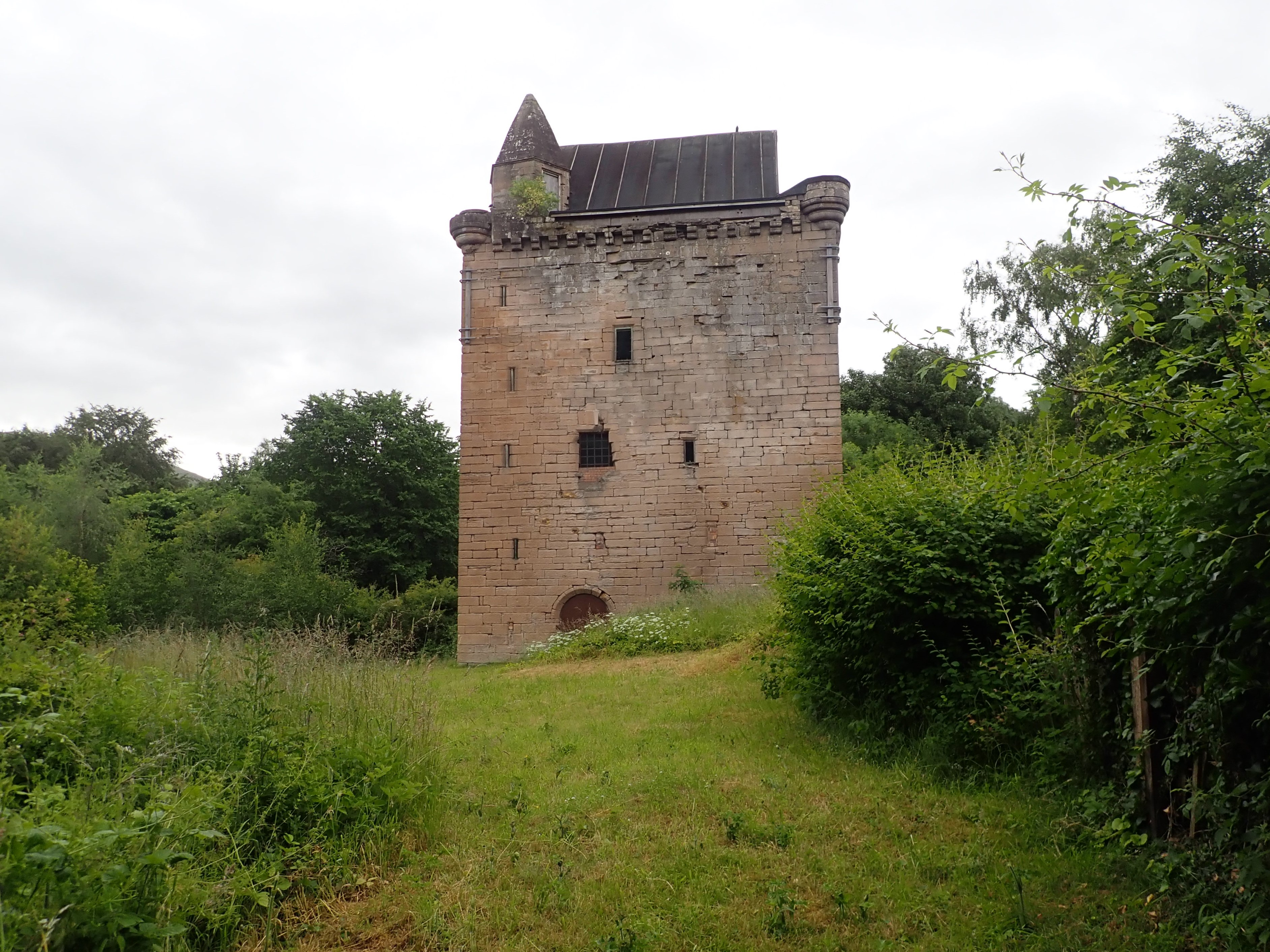
- The tower in 2022
- Interactive map of the Sauchie Tower area

General information
- Location: Clackmannanshire, Fishcross, Scotland

Technical details
- Size: 11.5 by 10.3 metres (38 by 34 ft)

Sauchie Tower, also known as Devon Tower, is a 15th-century tower house in Clackmannanshire, Scotland. The tower is located by the village of Fishcross, 1 kilometre (0.62 mi) north of Sauchie and 2.5 kilometres (1.6 mi) north of Alloa, close to the River Devon. It is protected as a Scheduled Ancient Monument.

== History ==
The lands of Sauchie were granted by King Robert the Bruce to Henri de Annand, Sheriff of Clackmannan, in 1321. In 1431, Sir James Schaw of Greenock, Comptroller to the King, acquired the lands of Sauchie when he married the heiress Mary de Annand. Sauchie Tower was built by Sir James soon after. His son was appointed Governor of Stirling Castle in 1460. The Schaws held the land into the 17th century, with several members of the family serving in the Scottish royal household.

On 5 September 1503, the gardener of Sauchie bought a gift of pears to James IV. Mary, Queen of Scots visited Sauchie and Alloa Tower in May 1565.

Around 1631, Alexander Schaw, who was knighted by King Charles I in 1633, built a house in the courtyard to the north-west of the tower. Another house on the estate, Schawpark, was built around 1700, and in 1752, Sauchie passed by marriage to the Cathcart family. Around this time the tower is thought to have been gutted by fire, and was not subsequently lived in. The roof and turrets were destroyed in the second half of the nineteenth century. Old Sauchie House, in the courtyard, was demolished after the estate was bought for coal extraction in the 1930s. The tower was derelict but in good condition in 1950. Schawpark was sold about 1802 to the Earl of Mansfield, just prior to his assuming the position of Lord Lieutenant of Clackmannanshire, but it was demolished in 1961.

Proposals for restoration of the tower were first put forward in the 1980s, when a series of excavations were carried out. However, restoration work was never completed. The building is now owned by Clackmannanshire Heritage Trust, which has erected a temporary roof. In 2002, the Friends of Sauchie Tower were formed to promote the restoration of the building. With a Heritage Lottery Fund award of £46,300, the group undertook site clearance, carried out further excavations, and produced a DVD to raise awareness of Sauchie Tower.

== The tower ==
The tower measures 11.5 by 10.3 metres (38 by 34 ft) and rises four storeys to a corbelled parapet walk, with bartizans (open round towers) at the corners. At the north-west corner is a hexagonal cap-house (a small room covering the top of the stair), with a pyramidal roof. The vaulted basement contains a well, and the main hall is at first-floor level. The tower is 79 feet tall and was surrounded by a moat with a draw-bridge.
