= Clackmannan =

Town and parish in Scotland

Coordinates: 56.107°N 3.749°W

Clackmannan: Scottish Gaelic: Clach Mhanann
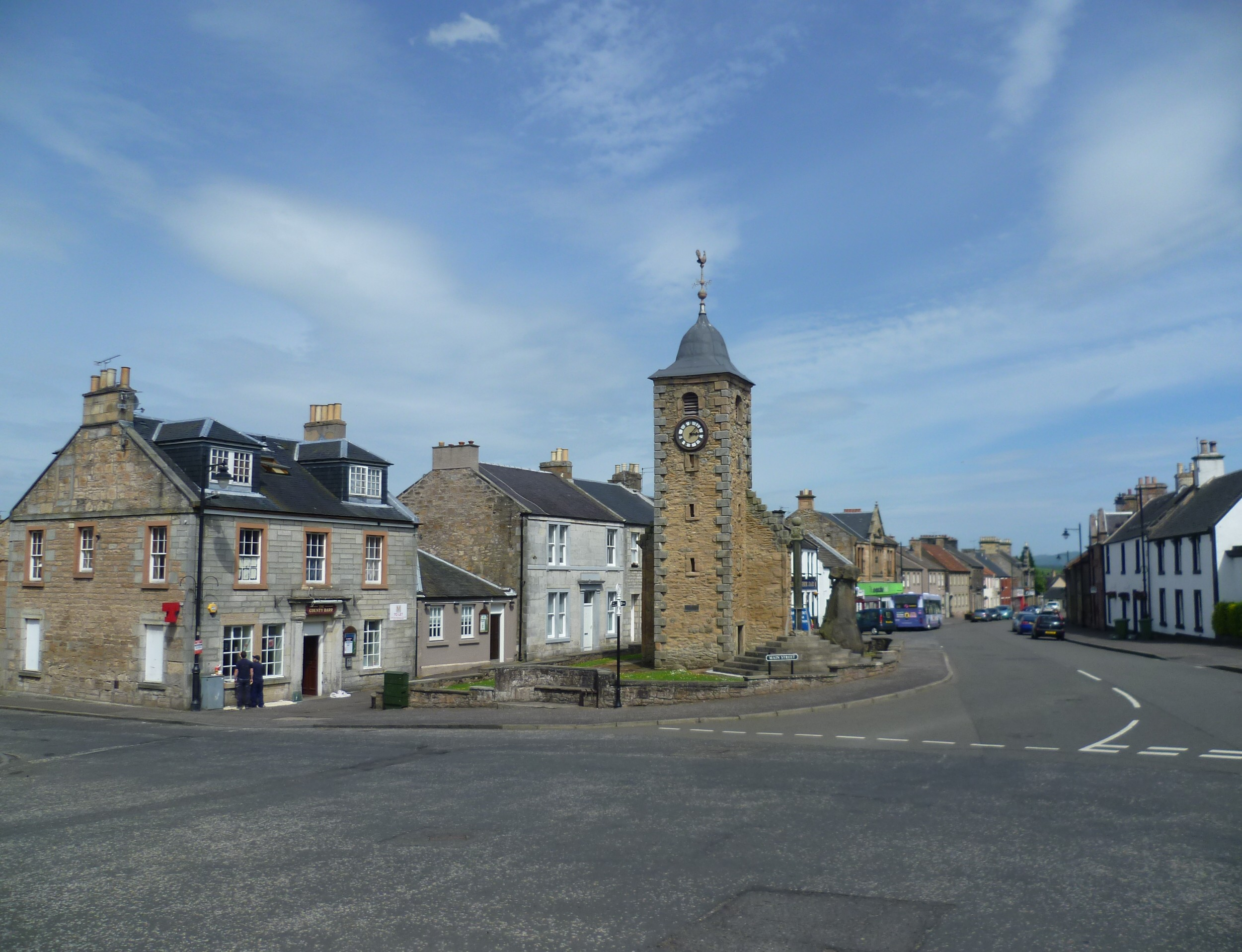
- Clackmannan Tolbooth and Main Street (to the right)

- Location within Clackmannanshire
- Area: 0.40 sq mi (1.0 km^{2})
- Population: 3,260 (2020)
  - Density: 8,150/sq mi (3,150/km^{2})
- OS grid reference: NS911919
- Council area: Clackmannanshire
- Lieutenancy area: Clackmannanshire
- Country: Scotland
- Sovereign state: United Kingdom
- Post town: CLACKMANNAN
- Postcode district: FK10
- Dialling code: 01259
- Police: Scotland
- Fire: Scottish
- Ambulance: Scottish
- UK Parliament: Alloa and Grangemouth
- Scottish Parliament: Clackmannanshire and Dunblane

Clackmannan (/klækˈmænən/; Scottish Gaelic: Clach Mhanann, lit. 'stone of the Manau') is a small town and civil parish set in the Central Lowlands of Scotland. Situated within the Forth Valley, Clackmannan is 1.8 miles (2.9 km) south-east of Alloa and 3.2 miles (5.1 km) south of Tillicoultry. The town is within the county of Clackmannanshire, of which it was formerly the county town, until Alloa overtook it in size and importance.

== Name and toponymy ==
The name Clackmannan may be of Brittonic origin. The first element is probably *clog, meaning "rock, crag, cliff" (cf. Welsh clog, Gaelic clach), and the second is the regional or ethnic name Manau, seen also in Slamannan (Sliabh Mhanann) and possible Dalmeny (though in Gaelic this is Dùn Mheinidh). The name comes from the root man- meaning "projecting" and may have ties to the Celtic deity Manannán. The name of the town has been said to allude to the Stone of Manau or Stone of Mannan, a pagan monument that can be seen in the town square beside Clackmannan Tolbooth, which dates from 1592.

A crater on asteroid 253 Mathilde is named after Clackmannan. Because Mathilde is a dark, carbonaceous body, its craters have been named after famous coalfields from across the world. The Clackmannan Group is the name given to a suite of rocks of late Dinantian and Namurian age laid down during the Carboniferous period in the Midland Valley of Scotland.

== History ==
The early growth of the town was due in large part to the port which lay on the banks of the tidal stretch of the River Black Devon at its confluence with the River Forth. There are now no visible signs of the port, and Clackmannan now sits over a mile inland from the river. The locals tried in vain to keep their port viable by digging out the silt but to no avail. The silting of Clackmannan's port and the fact that boats could no longer access it meant that the port in Alloa came in to use instead, and this led to an increase in the population of Alloa. Alloa replaced Clackmannan as the county town of Clackmannanshire in 1822. The population of Clackmannan was 1,077 in 1841.

During the 12th century, the area formed part of the lands controlled by the abbots of Cambuskenneth. Later it became associated with the Bruce family, who, during the 14th century, built a strategic tower-house called Clackmannan Tower and in the 16th century built a mansion alongside the tower. The mansion was demolished when local branch of the Bruces died out in 1791, although its stones may have been recycled to build the new parish church in 1815. It still stands above the town according to Historic Scotland, but entry is forbidden (because of subsidence).

The war memorial was designed by Sir Robert Lorimer in 1919.

== Archaeology ==
Headland Archaeology completed an excavation of a prehistoric and medieval site at Meadowend Farm, Kennet which lies to the south-east of Clackmannan and was within the corridor for the new road and crossing (the Clackmannanshire Bridge) over the River Forth near Kincardine.

Over 2,000 fragments of prehistoric pottery were recovered from the site, the vast majority from a dense concentration of pits or postholes dated to the Middle/Late Neolithic period. Several structures were identified on site, the most substantial a large roundhouse with an outer ring-groove and an entrance to the south-east with an extended porch. Two large post-built roundhouses were found, and a third post-built structure contained a hearth-pit, which had been filled with fire-cracked stones and charcoal. It was hoped that radiocarbon dating would enable more precise phasing of the structures.

== See also ==
- List of places in Clackmannanshire
- Clackmannan (UK Parliament constituency)
- Clackmannan F.C., former Scottish Football League members
