= Anchor portal =

Gantry structure supporting overhead power lines in a switchyard

An anchor portal or H-frame tower is a gantry structure supporting overhead power lines in a switchyard. Their static function is similar to a dead-end tower. Anchor portals are almost always steel-tube or steel-framework constructions.

== Gallery ==
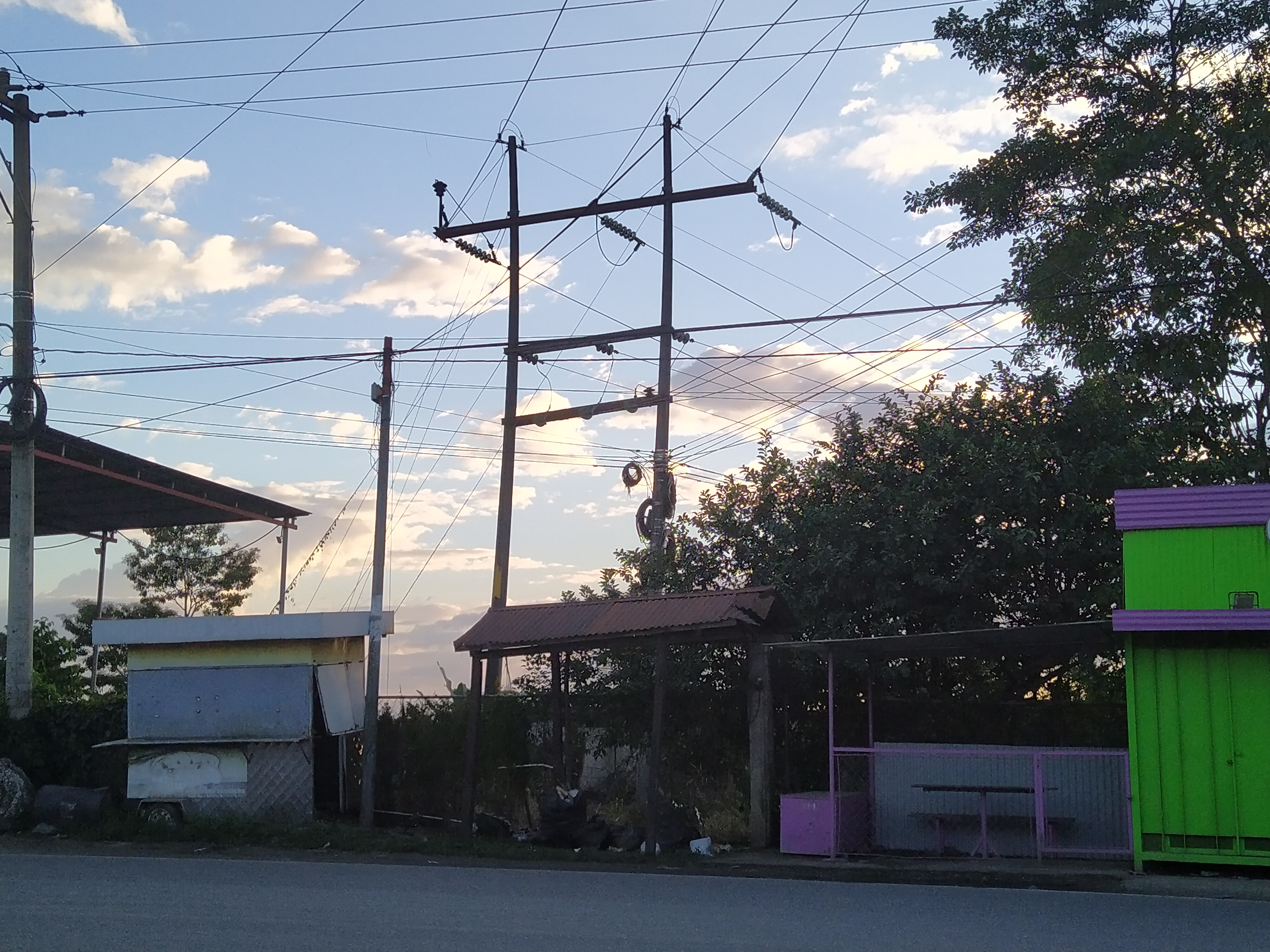
A simple H-frame anchor tower consisting of two poles and one horizontal crossarm, bearing similarity to the letter H

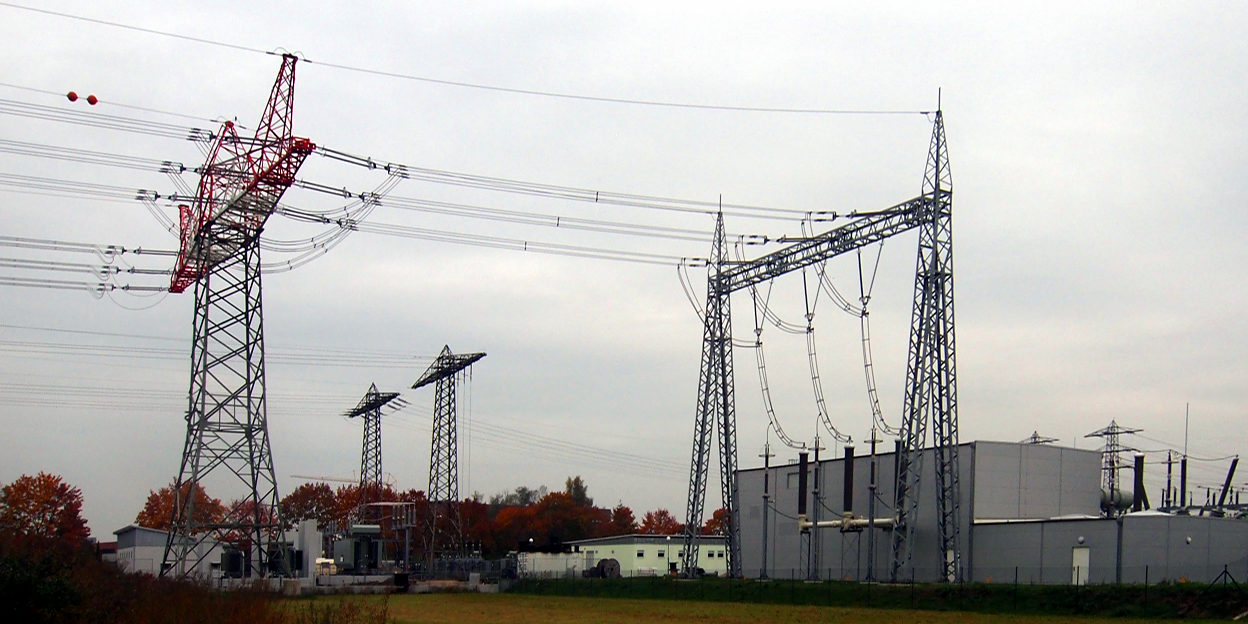
anchor pylon and anchor portal, 380kV

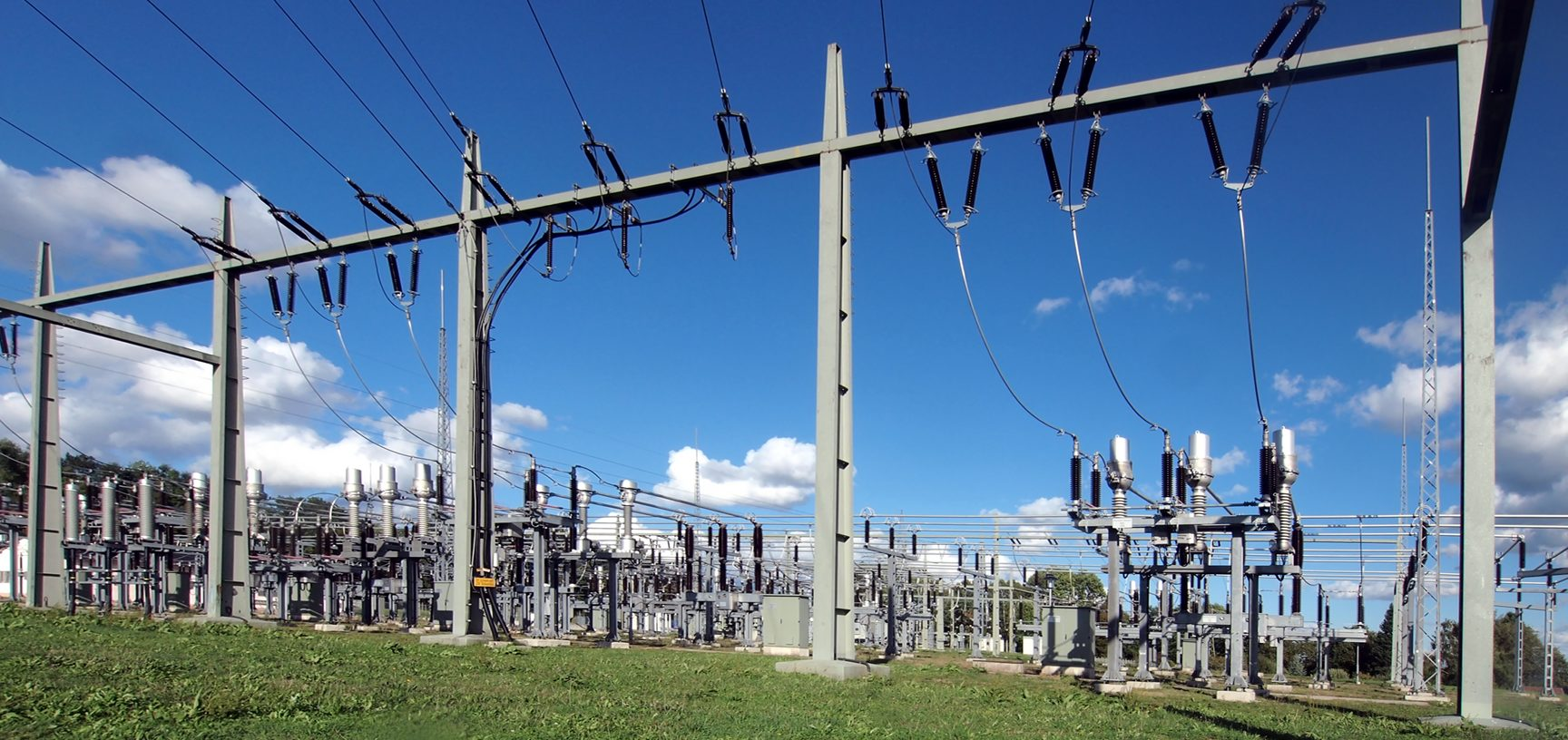
anchor gantry, 110kV

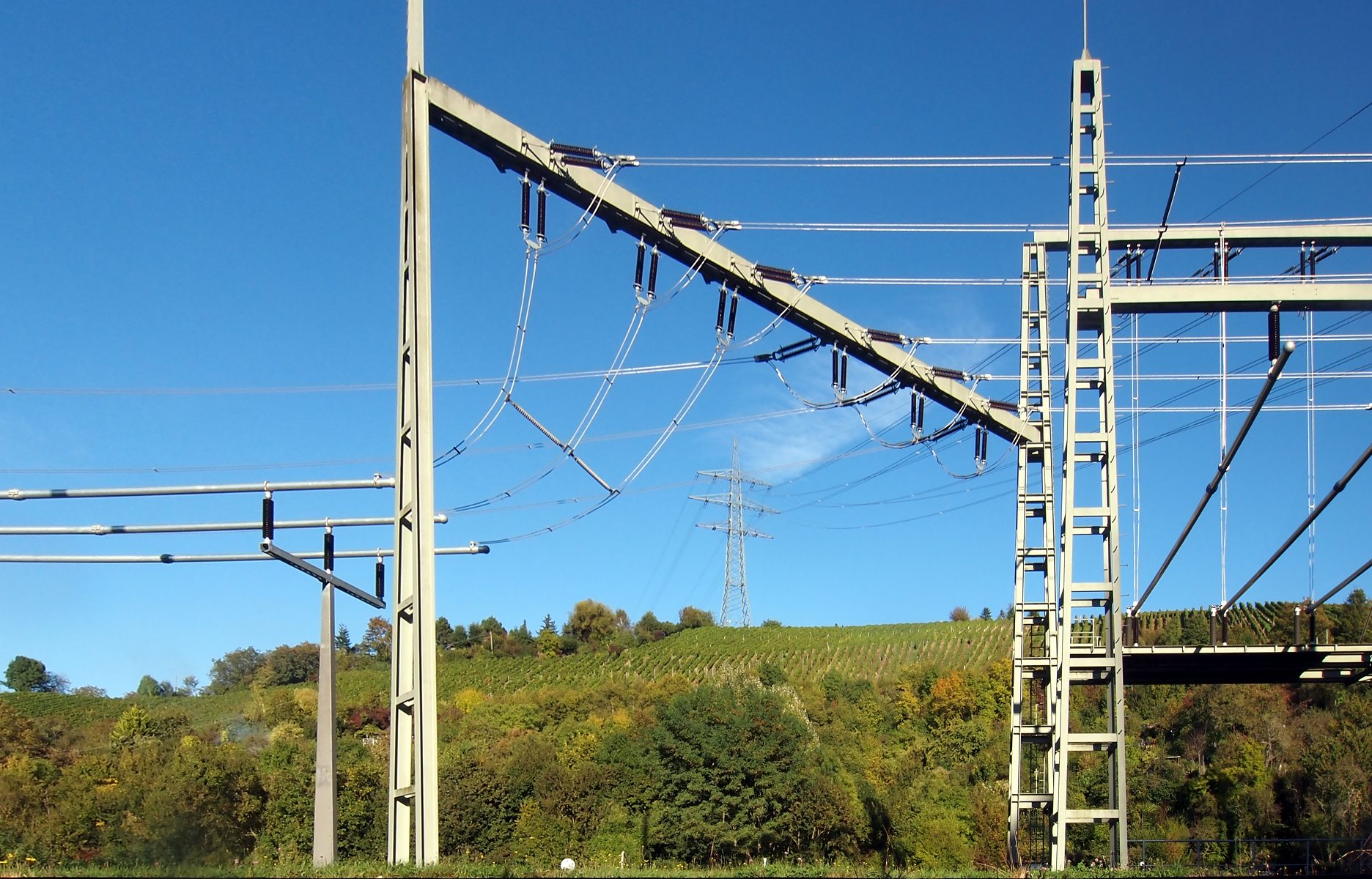
diagonal frame

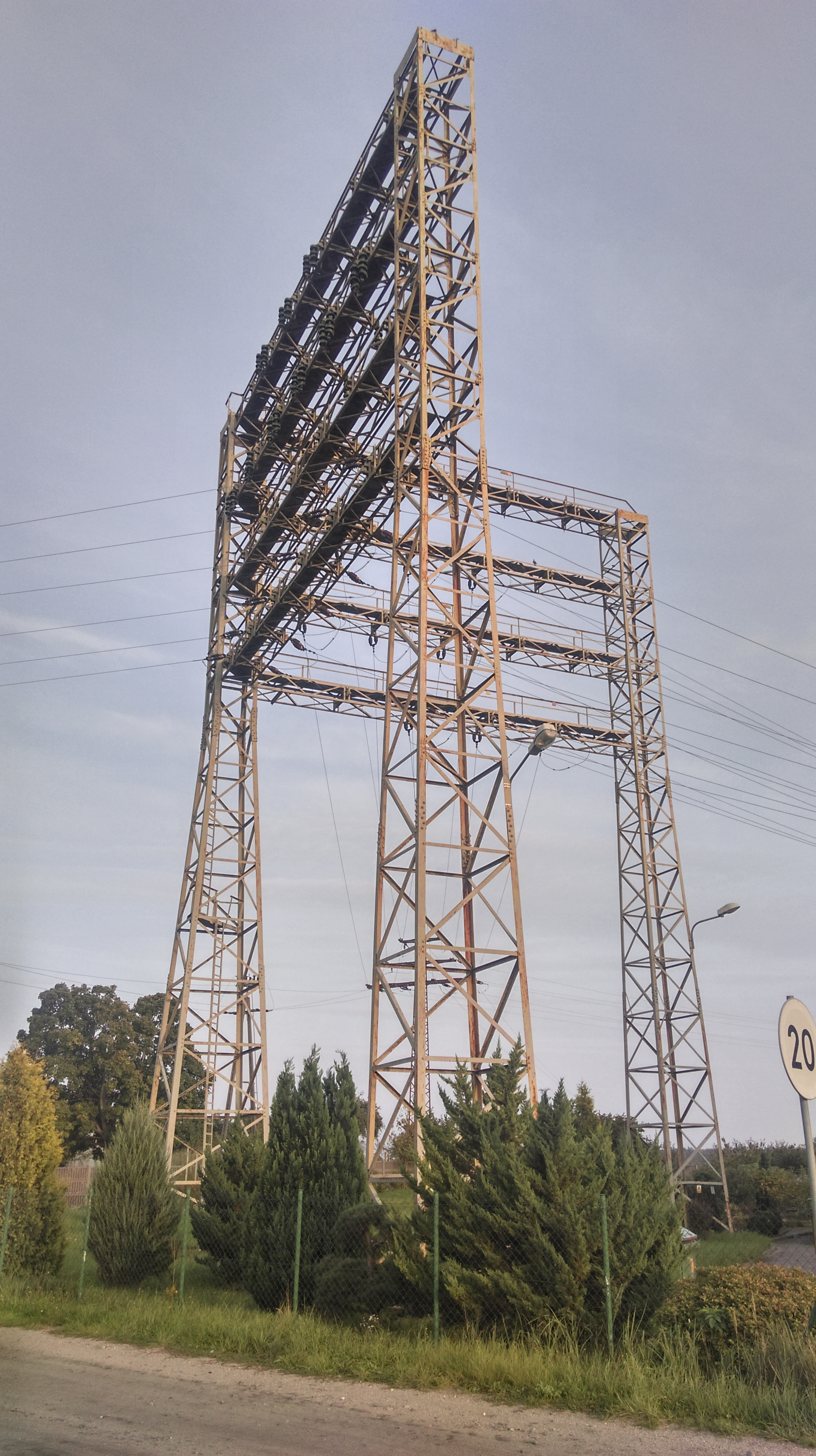
Multi-level gantry tower

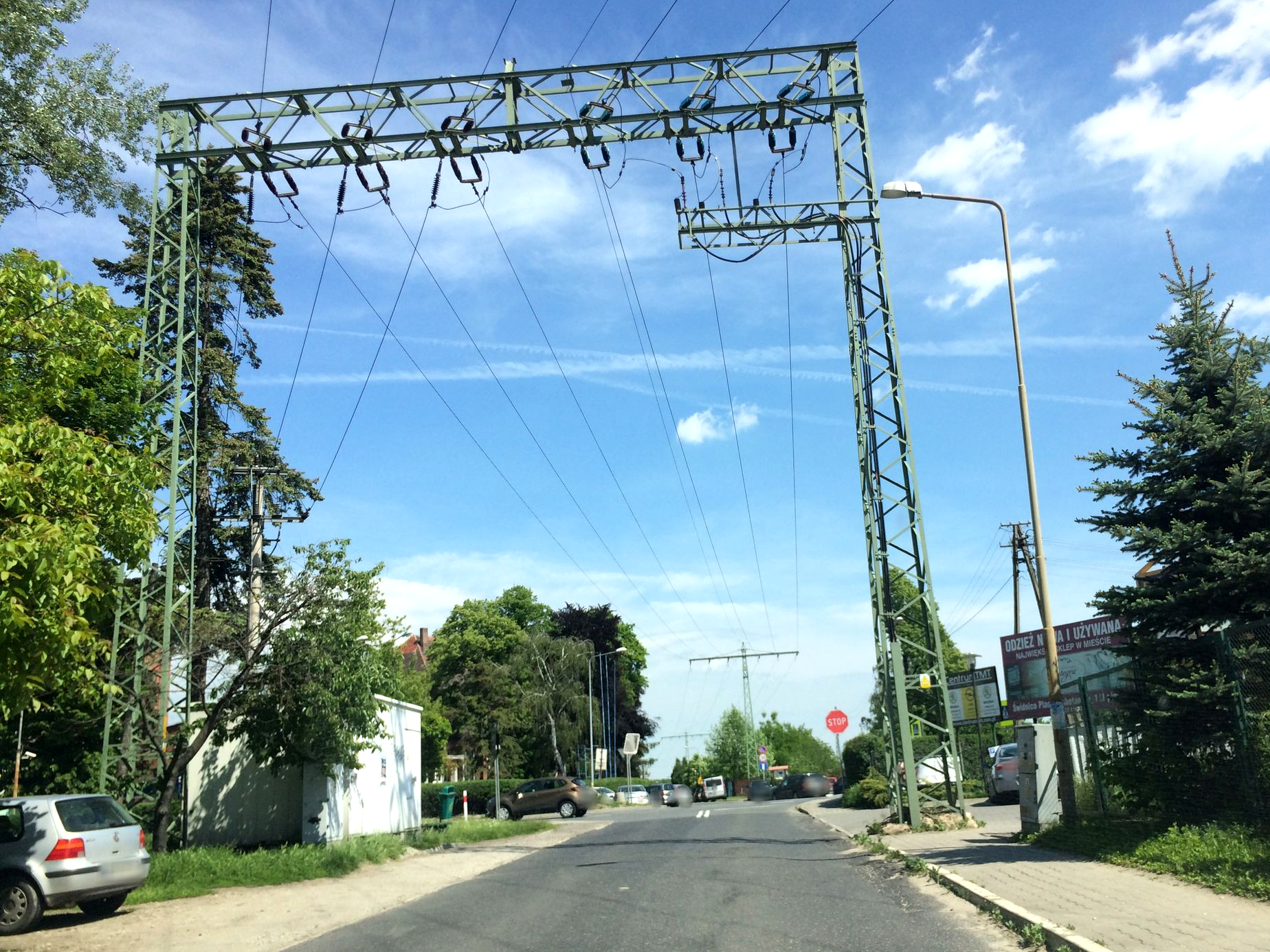
Gantry tower with road underneath
