= Suspension tower =

Tower from which electric power lines are suspended

In an electric power transmission line, a suspension tower is where the conductors are simply suspended from the tower, the mechanical tension being the same on each side.

In this case, the tower is supposed to carry a downward force, and a lateral force, but not a longitudinal force.

These may have, for each conductor, an insulator string hanging down from the tower, or two strings making a "V" shape. In either case, sometimes several insulator strings are used in parallel to give higher mechanical strength. These are used where a transmission line continues in a straight line, or turns through a small angle. In other cases, a tension tower (C or D Towers) is used.

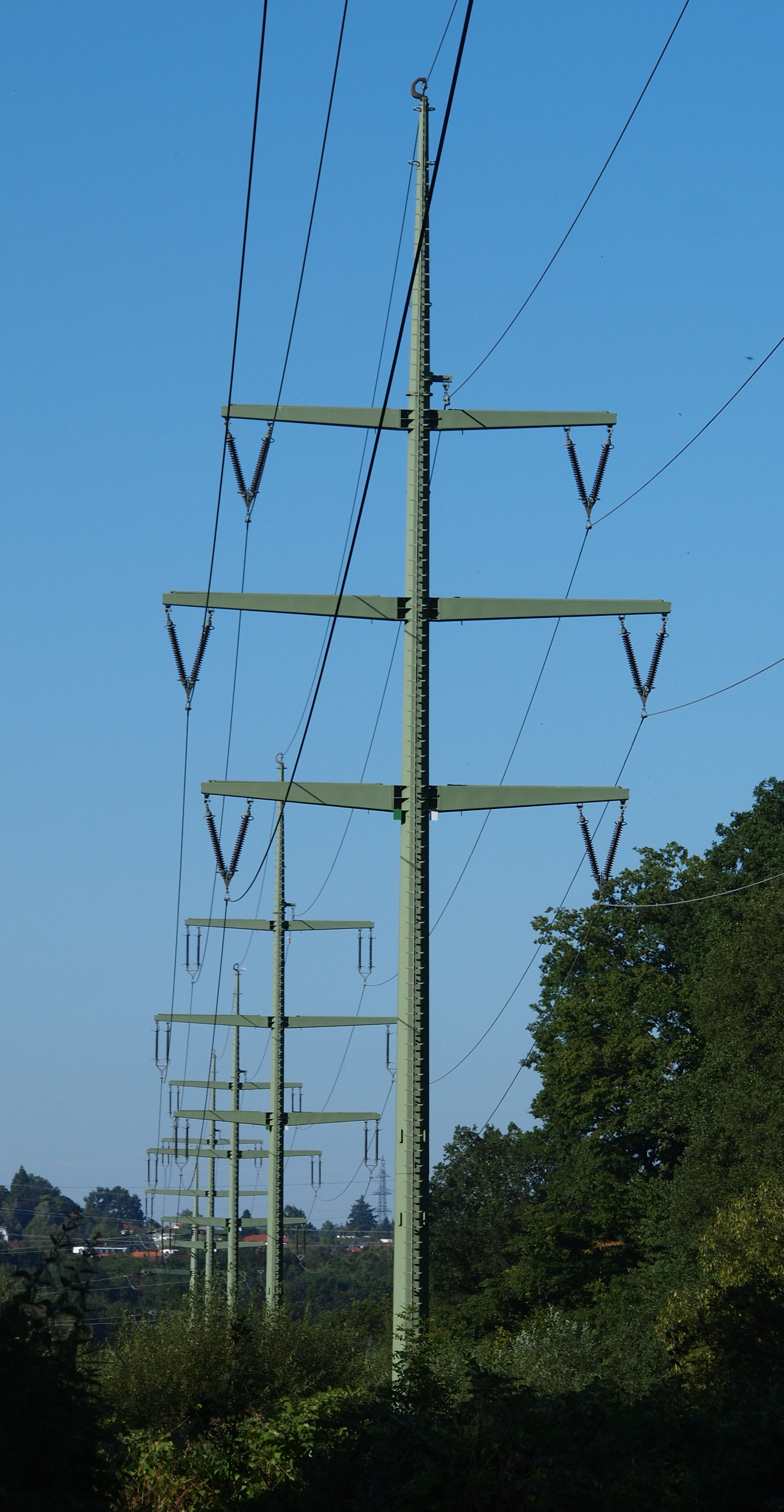
Suspension towers of a 110 kV power line in Germany

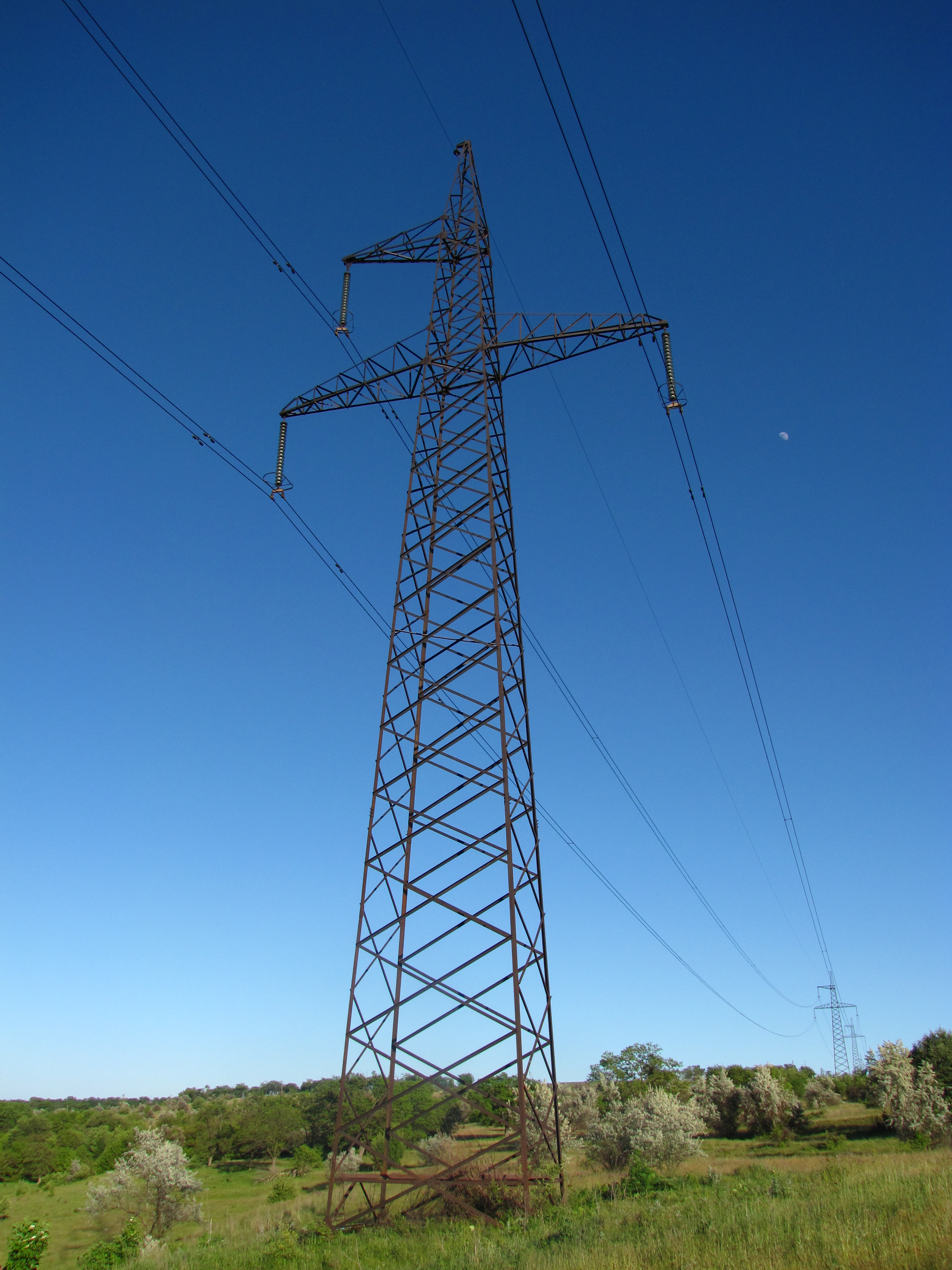
A suspension tower of a 330 kV powerline in Ukraine

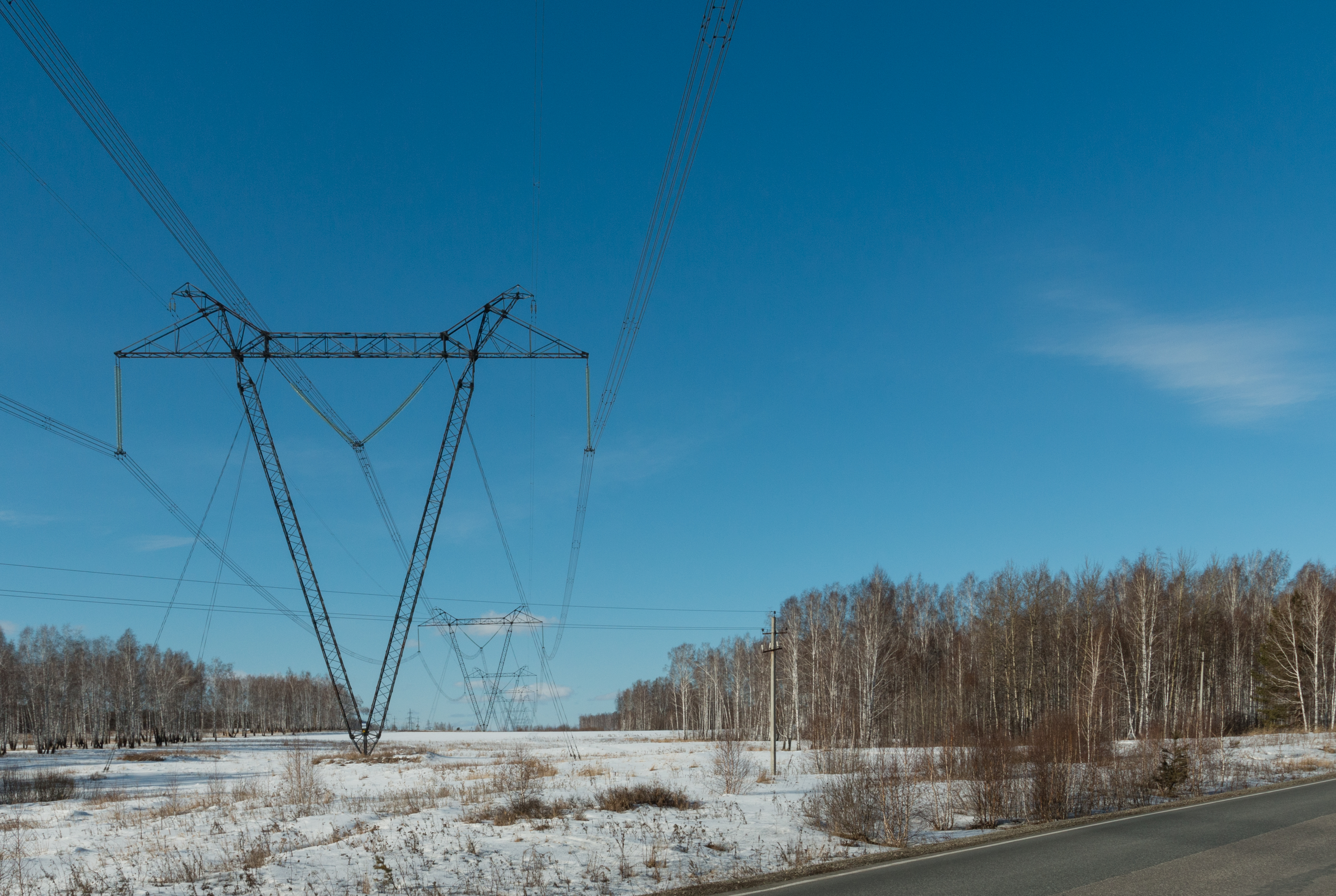
A suspension tower of a 1150 kV powerline in Russia

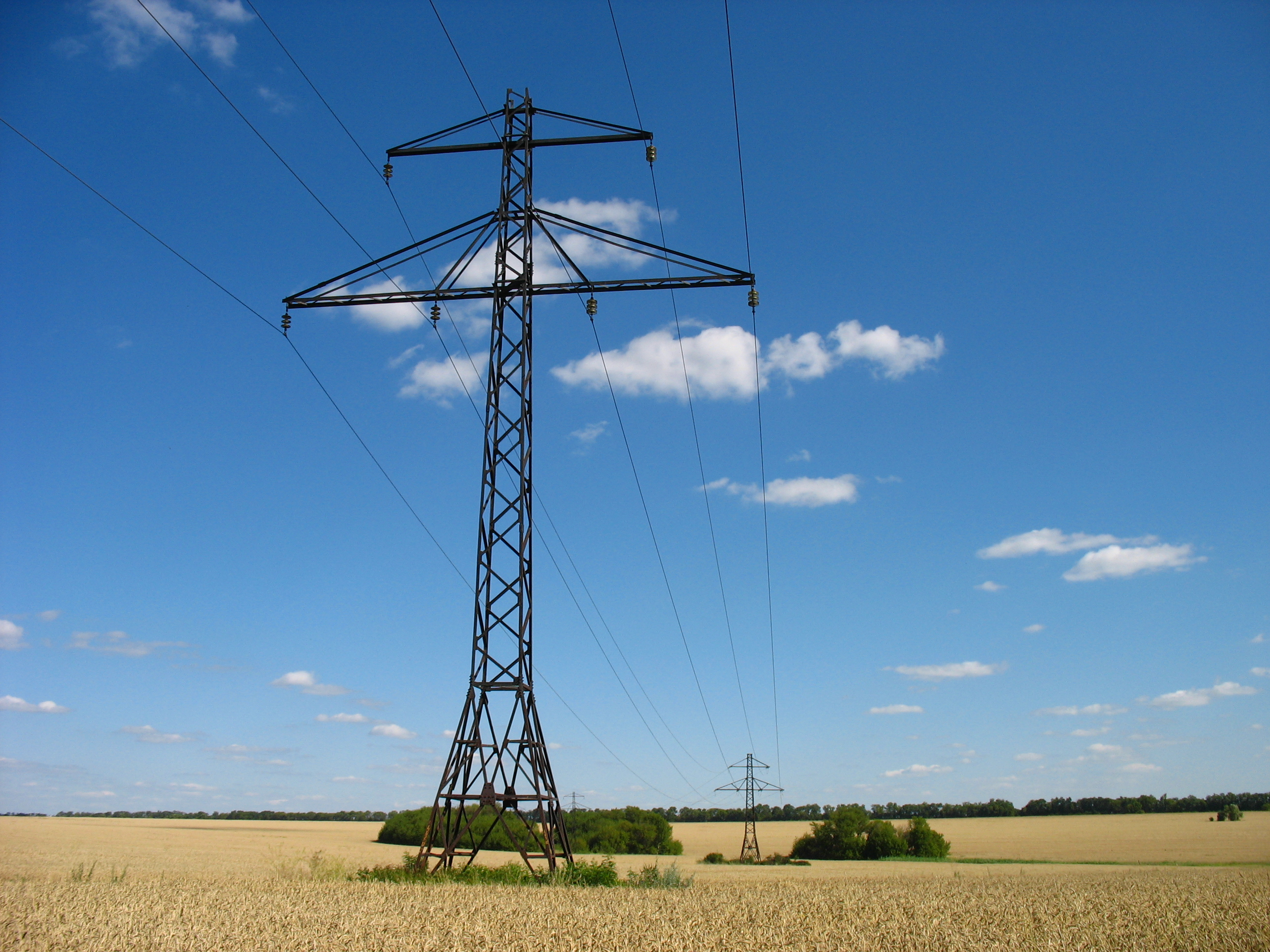
A suspension tower of a 35 kV powerline in Ukraine

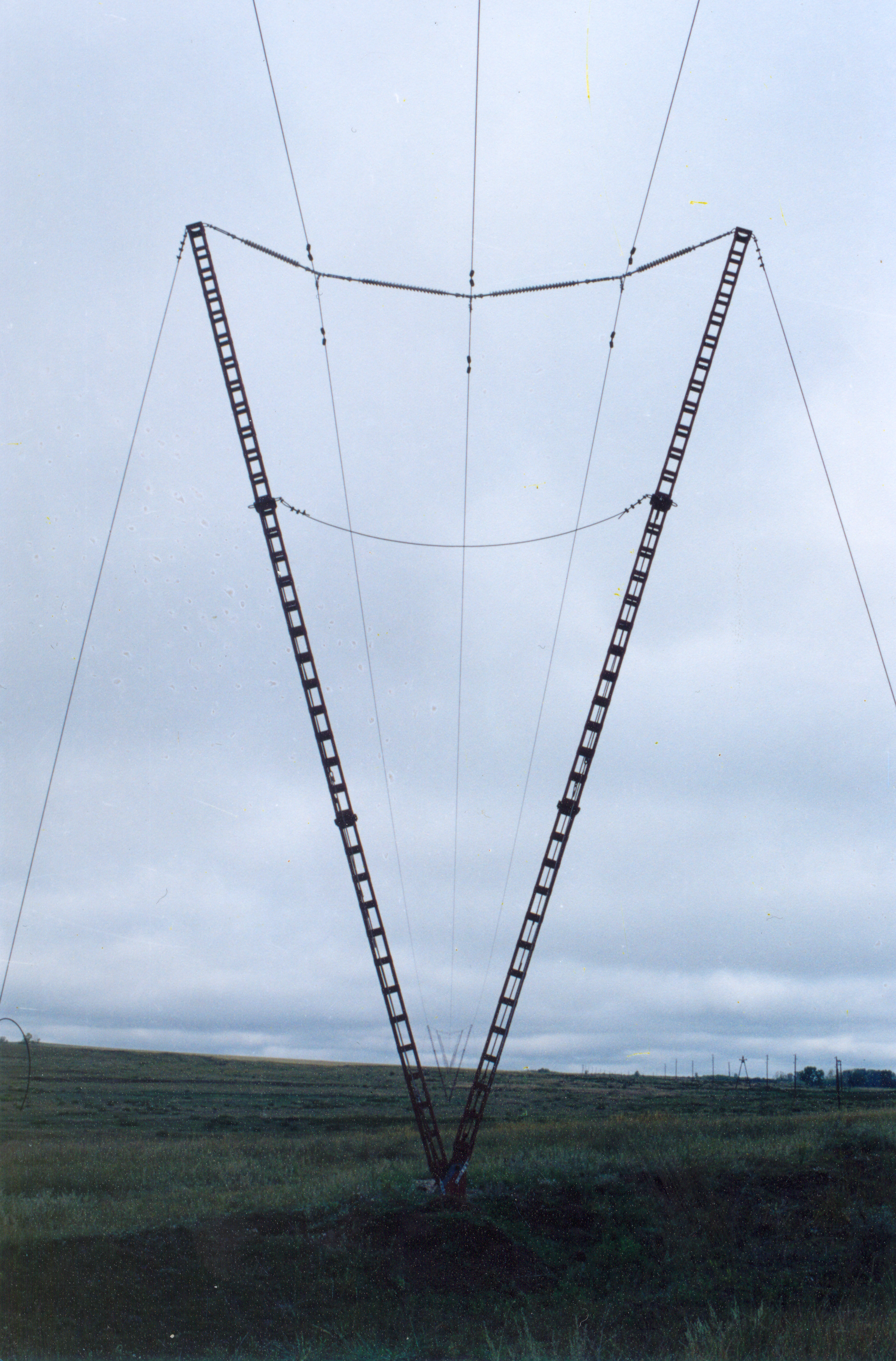
A guyed tower in Russia

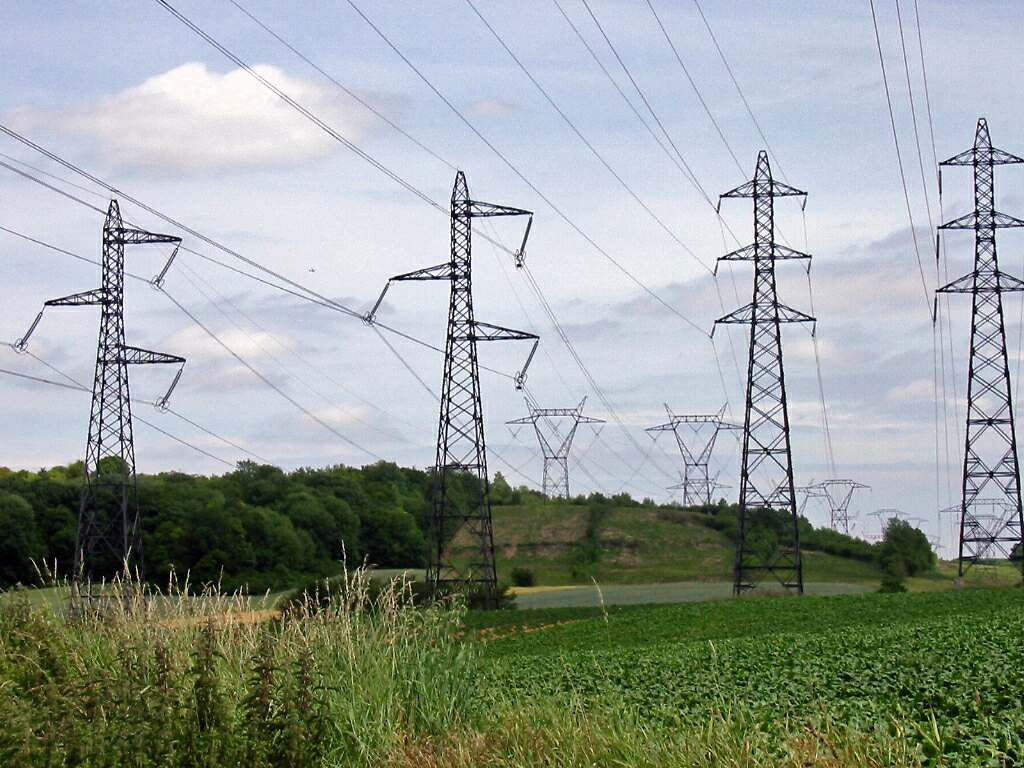
In France, it is common to bend lines at suspension towers with single insulators pulled to the side

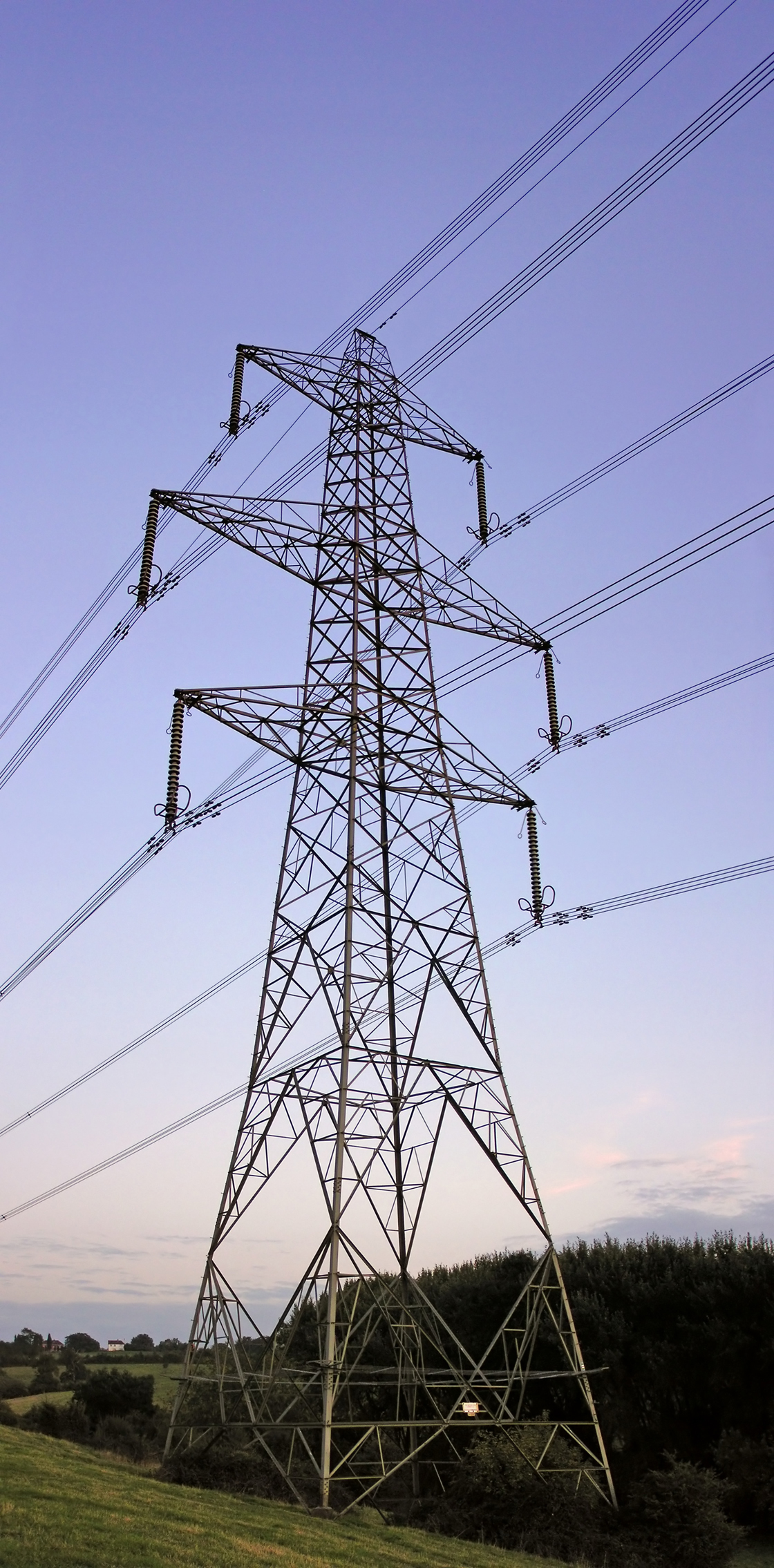
A suspension tower, UK

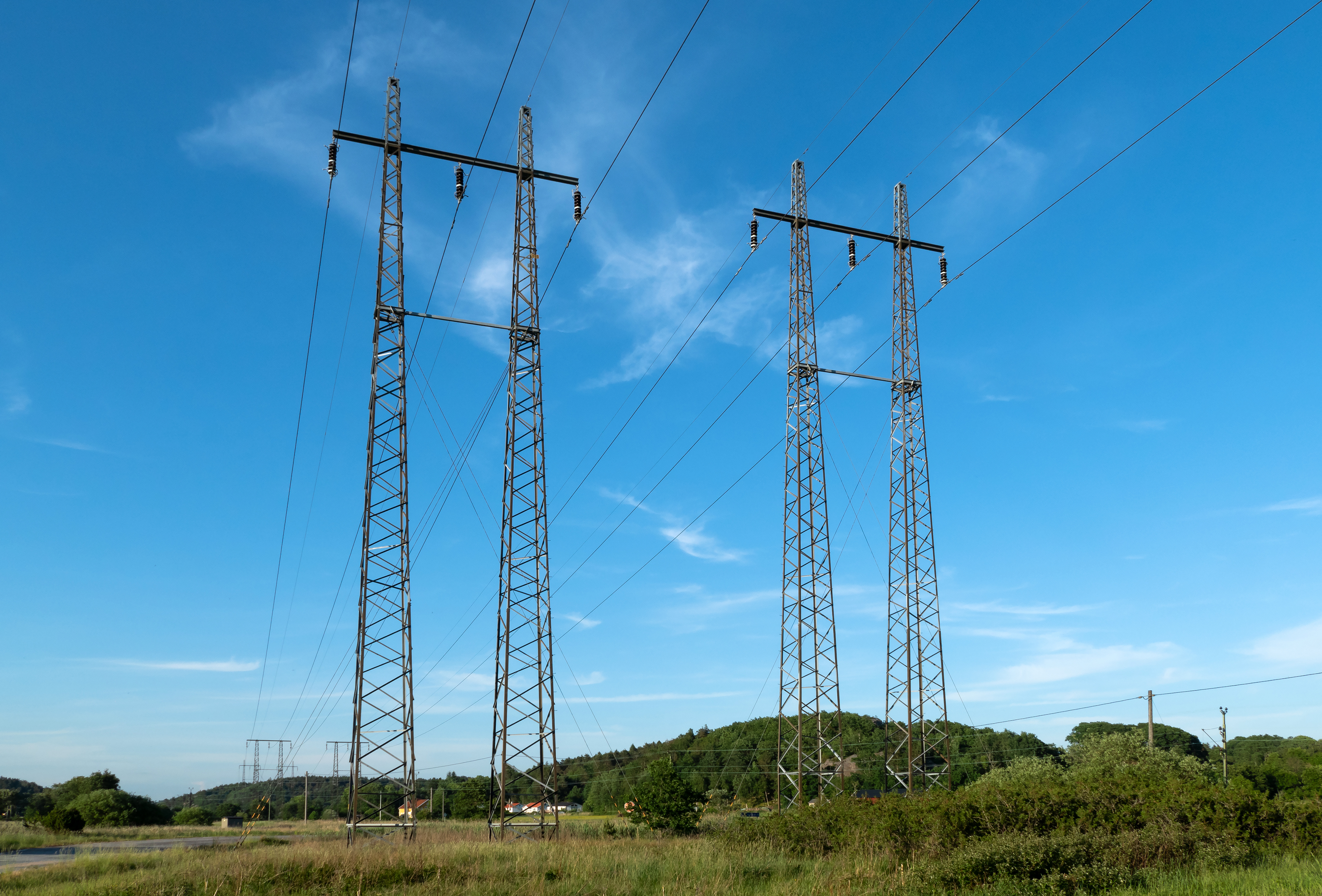
Suspension towers in Sweden

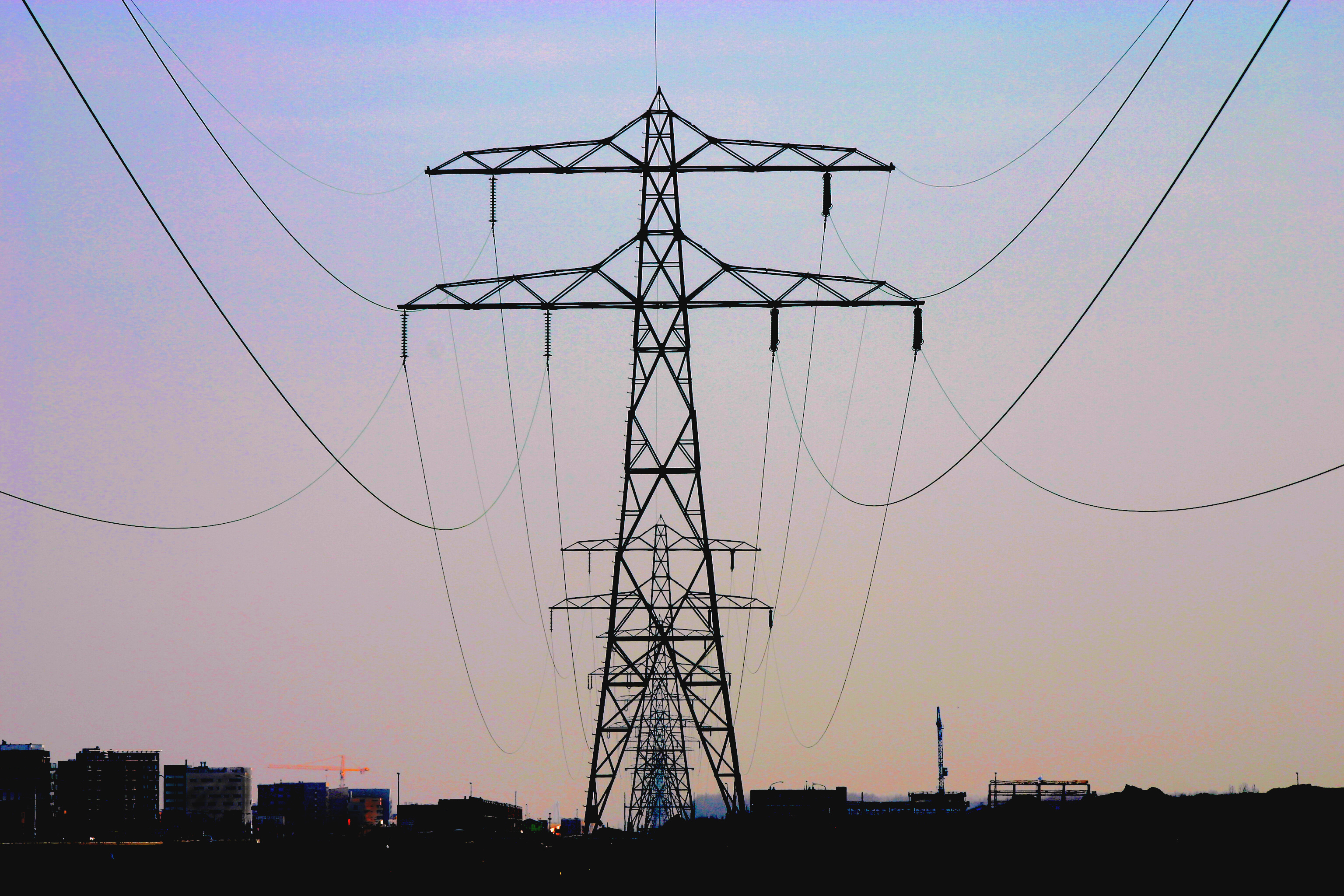
Row of suspension pylons near Amsterdam in the Netherlands

== See also ==
- Dead-end tower
- Transposition tower
