= Dead-end tower =

Structure used in construction of overhead power lines

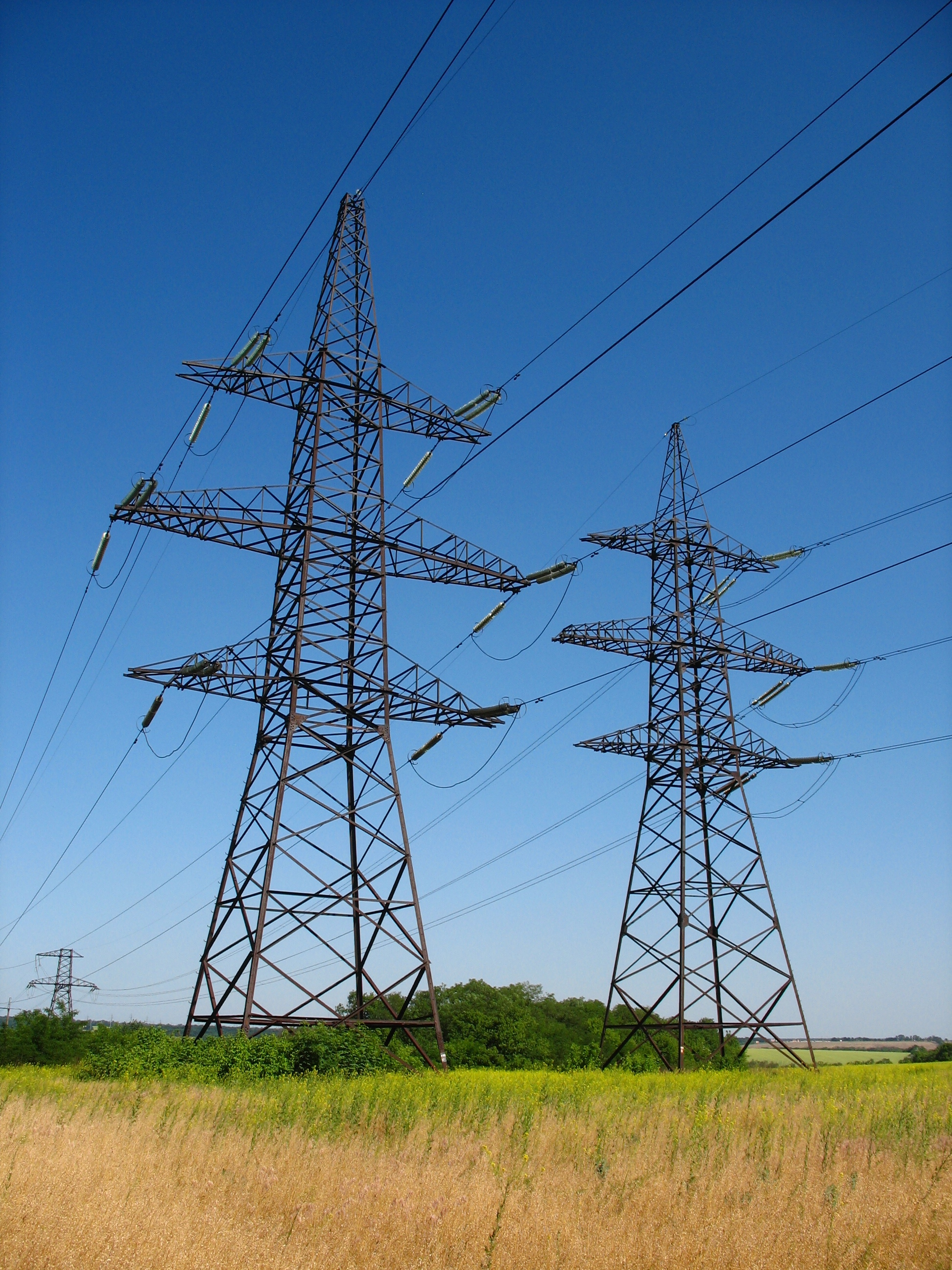
Dead-end ("anchor") towers

A dead-end tower (also tension tower, anchor tower, anchor pylon) is a fully self-supporting structure used in construction of overhead power lines. A dead-end transmission tower uses horizontal strain insulators at the end of conductors. Dead-end towers may be used at a substation as a transition to a "slack span" entering the equipment, when the circuit changes to a buried cable, when a transmission line changes direction by more than a few degrees, or at intervals along a straight run to limit the extent of a catastrophic collapse.

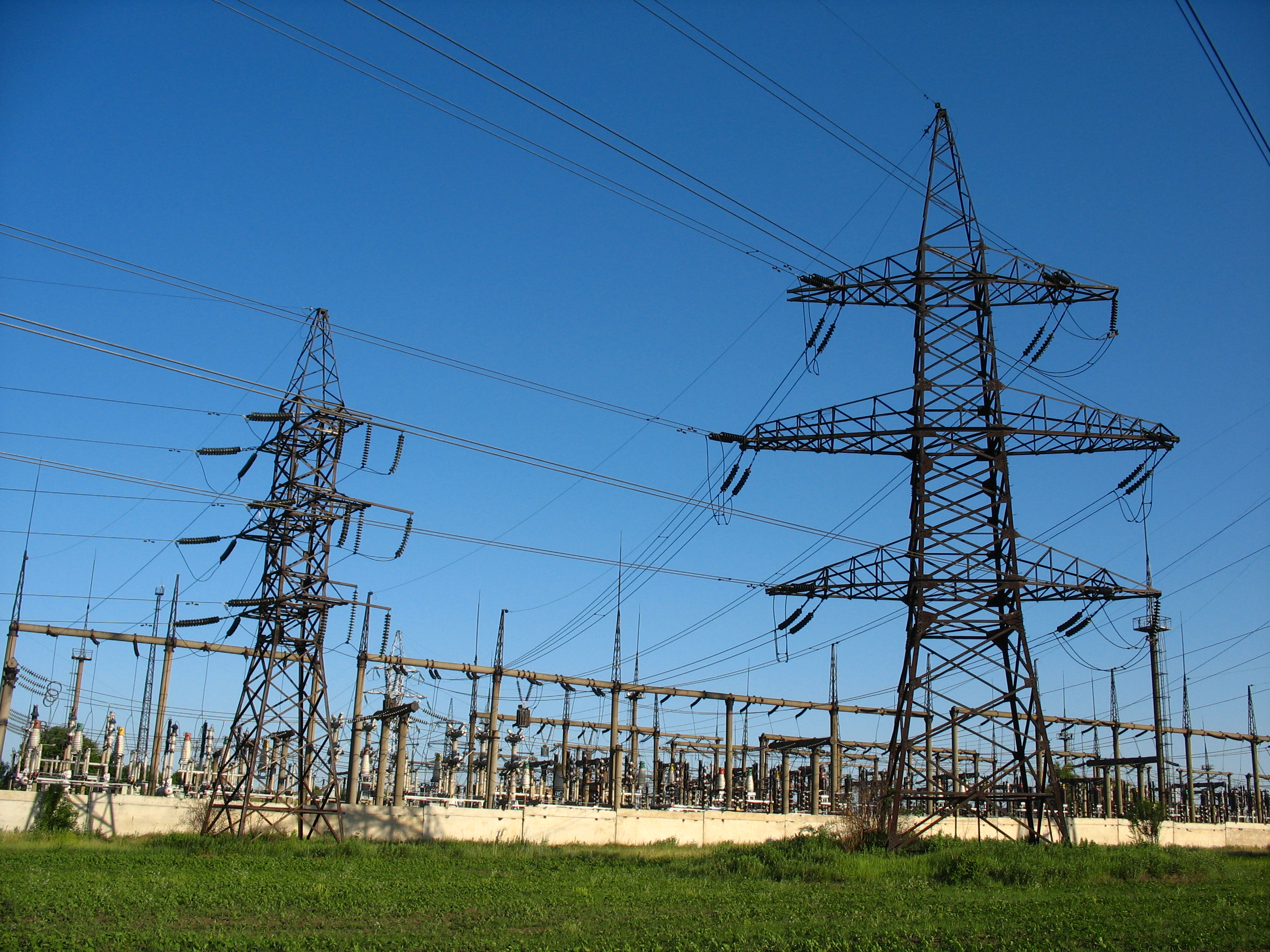
Strain pylons and an anchor gantry

Since dead-end towers require more material and are heavier and costlier than suspension towers, it is uneconomic to build a line with only self-supporting structures.

Dead-end towers are used at regular intervals in a long transmission line to limit the cascading tower failures that might occur after a conductor failure. An in-line dead-end tower will have two sets of strain insulators supporting the lines in either direction, with the lines connected by a jumper between the two segments. Dead-end towers can resist unbalanced forces due to line weight and tension, contrasted with suspension towers which mostly just support the conductor weight and have relatively low capacity for unbalanced load. Dead-end towers may use earth anchor cables to compensate for the asymmetric attachment of the conductors. They are often used when the power line must cross a large gap, such as a railway line, river, or valley.

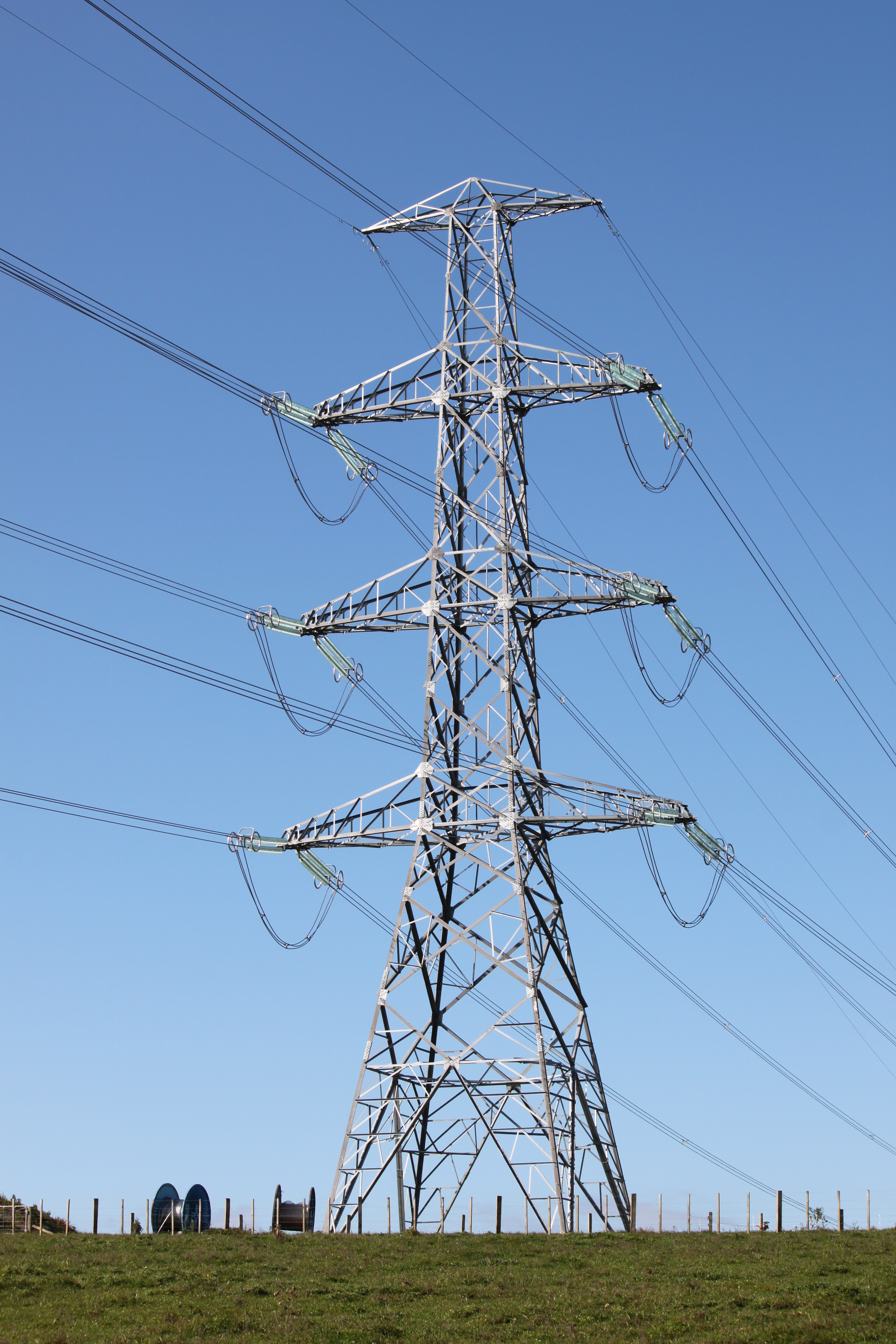
Strain tower on Transpower's 400 kV Whakamaru to Brownhill Road transmission line.

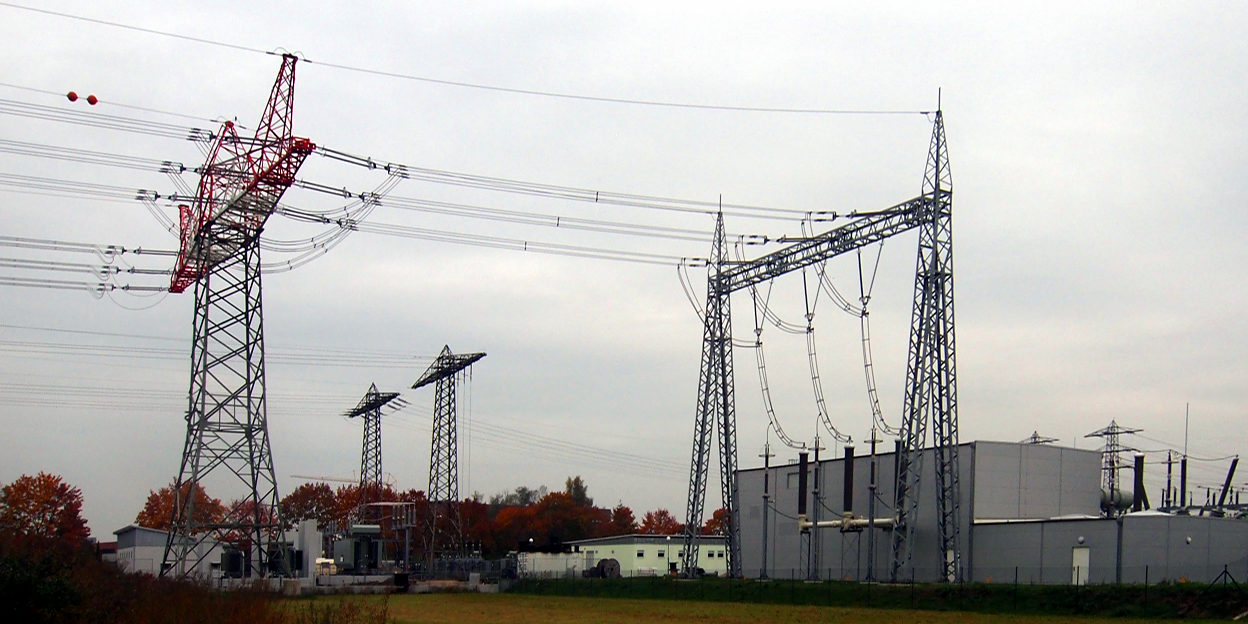
Tension tower (also called strain or dead end pylon

Dead-end towers may be constructed of the same materials as other structures of the line. They may be steel or aluminum lattice structures, tubular steel, concrete, or wood poles.

== Branch pylon ==
Dead-end towers are also employed at branch points as branch pylons. A tower at which the power line runs further as overhead line and as underground cable is a branch tower for a cable branch.

A branch pylon is used to start a line branch. The branch pylon is responsible for holding up both the main line and the start of the branch line. This makes a branch pylon also an anchor pylon since it must resist forces from both lines.

Branch pylons frequently, but not always, have one or more cross beams transverse to the direction of travel of the line for the admission of the branching electric circuits; some also have cross beams of the branching electric circuits lying in the direction of travel of the main line. Branch pylons without additional cross beams are occasionally constructed.

Branches

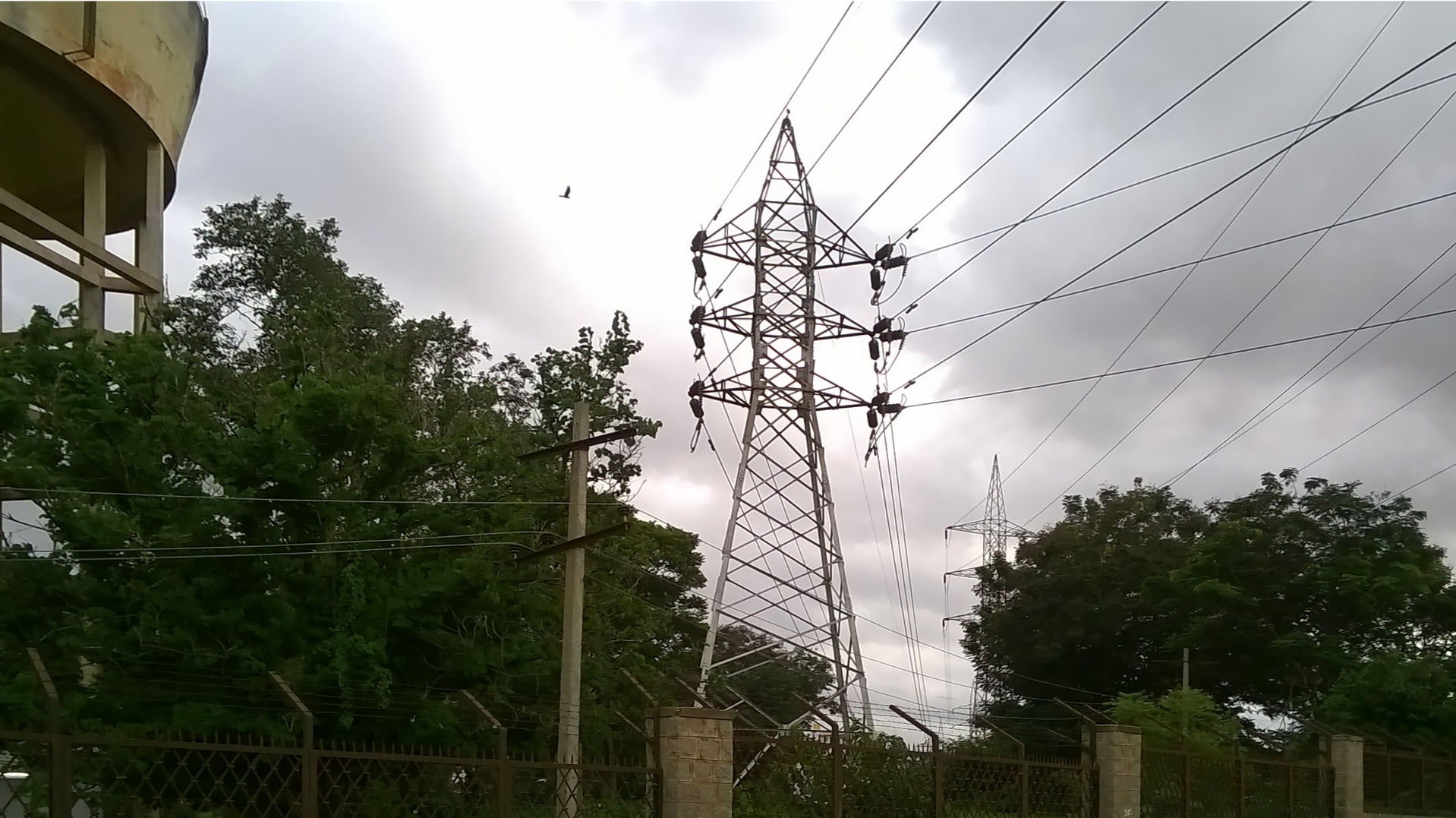
A branch pylon in the strict sense in India

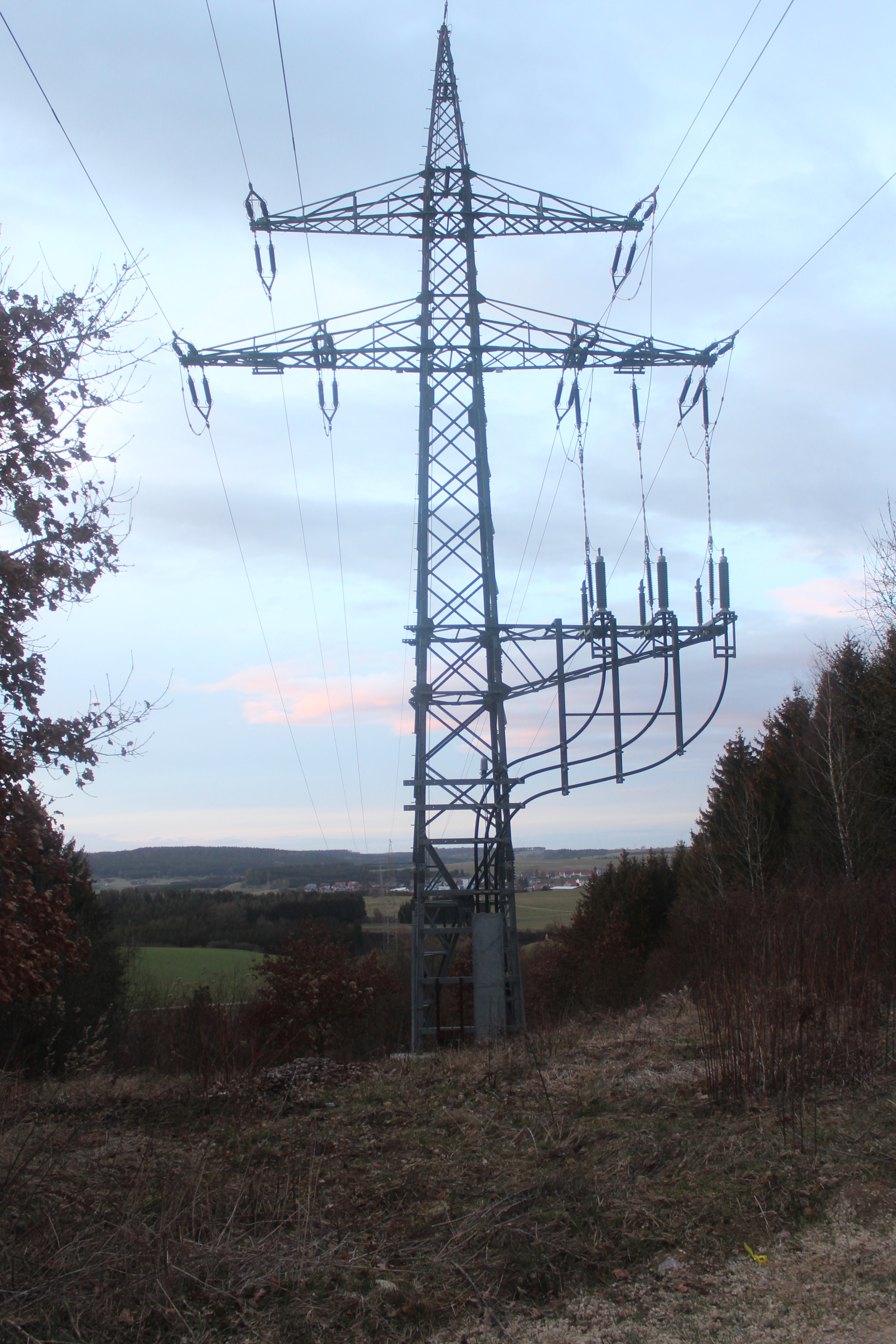
Cable branch

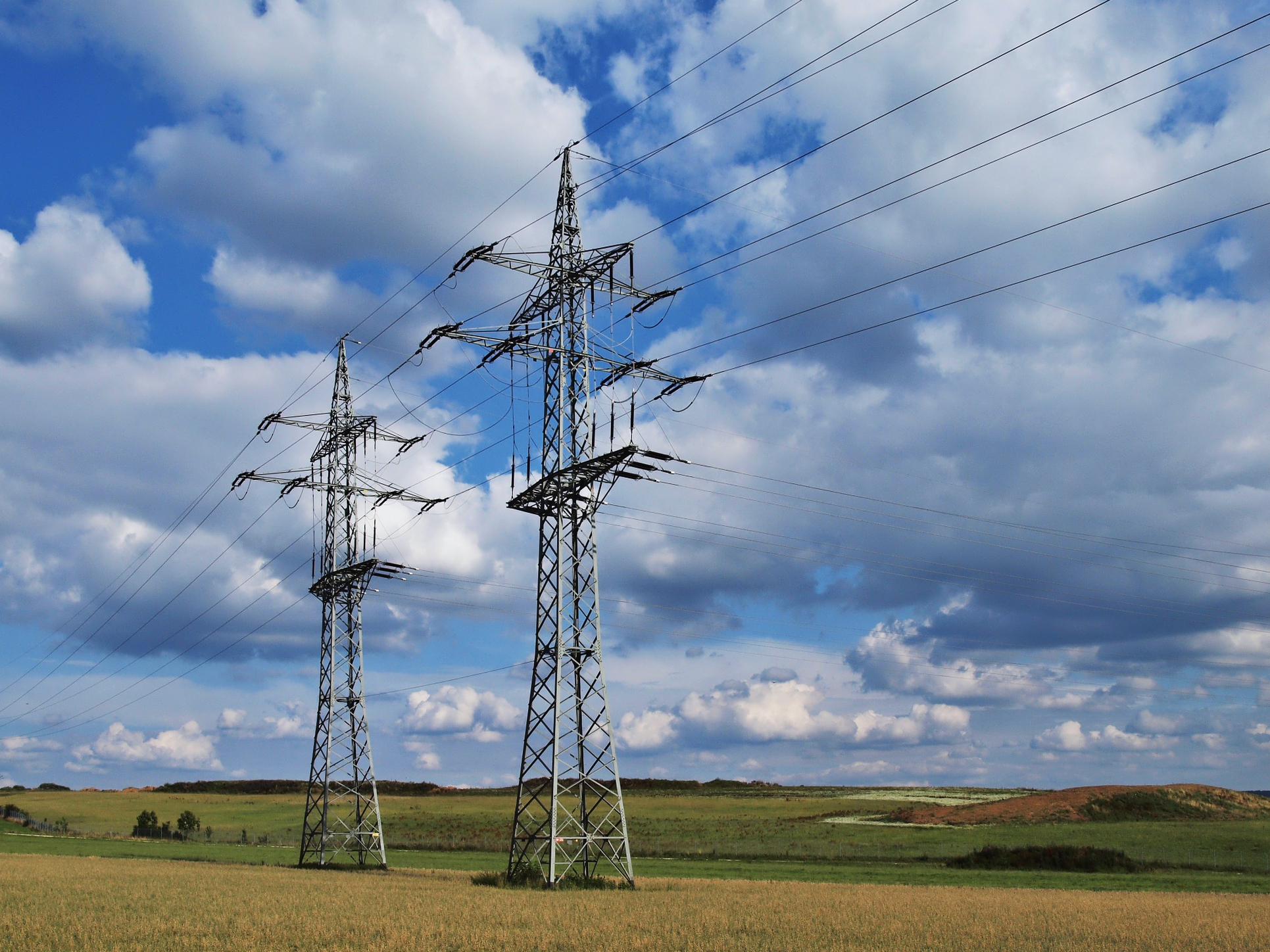
Loop-in of the branch, no through line

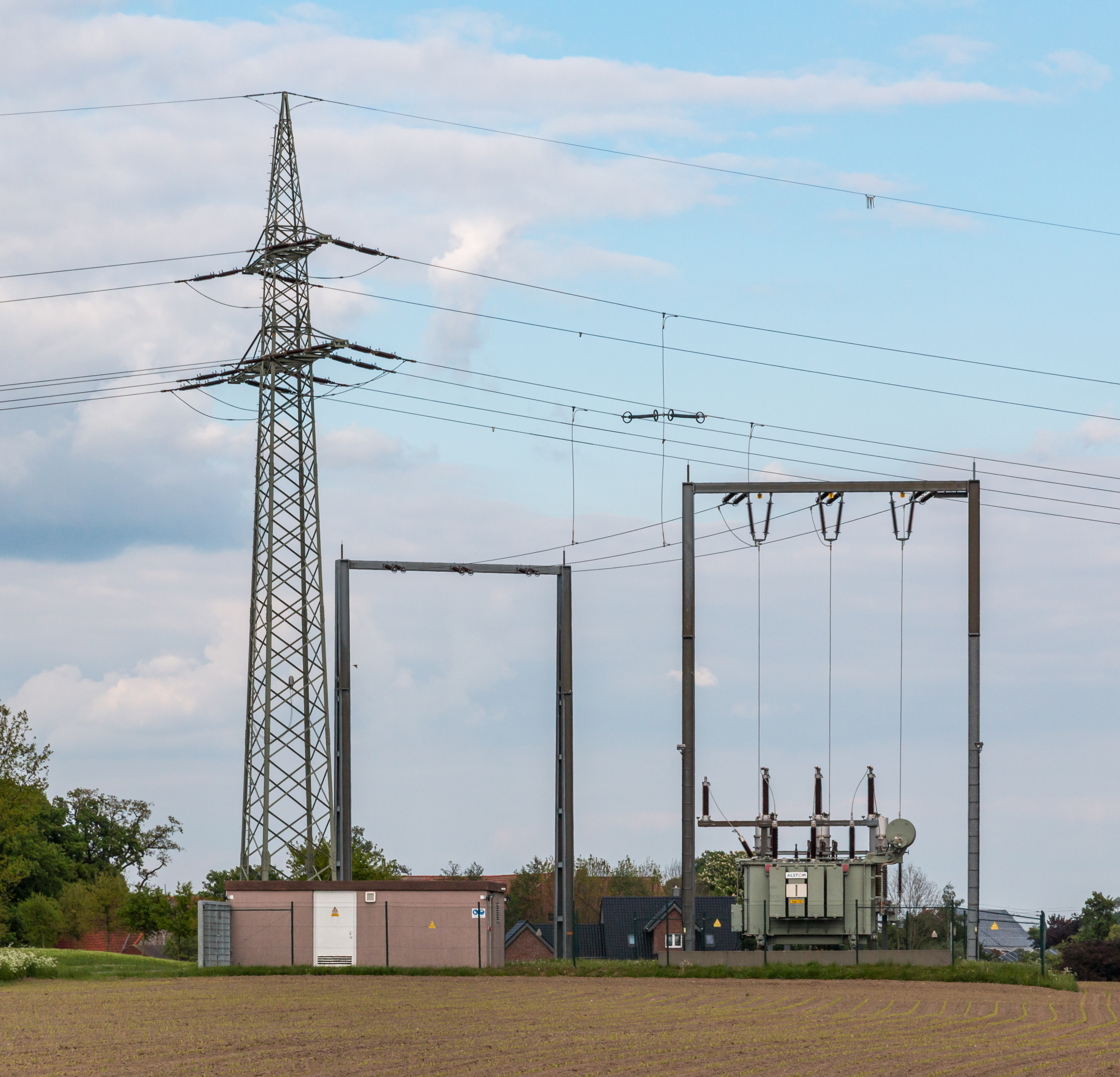
Simple branch within the span

== Termination pylon ==
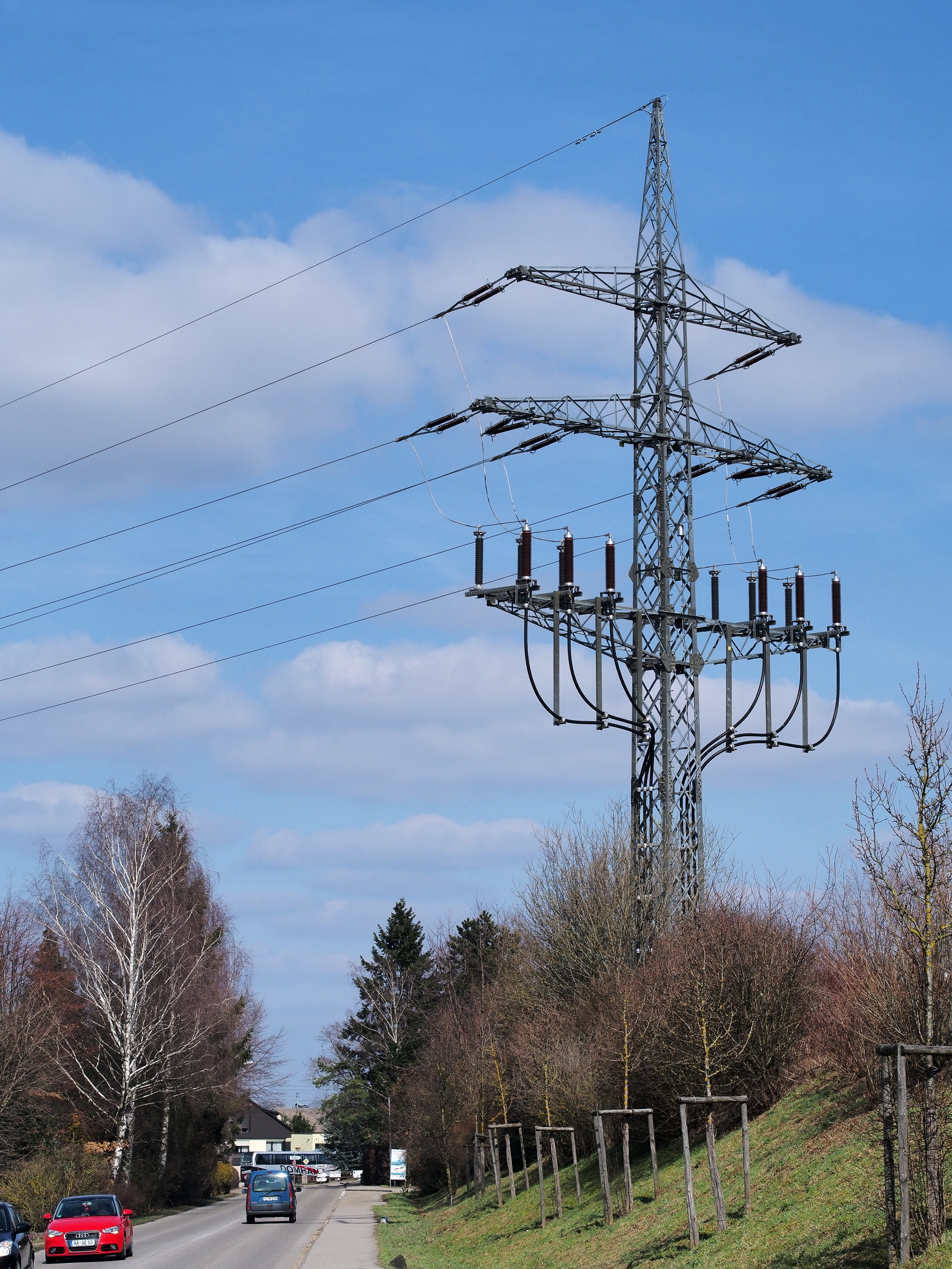
Termination tower (overhead line to underground cable)

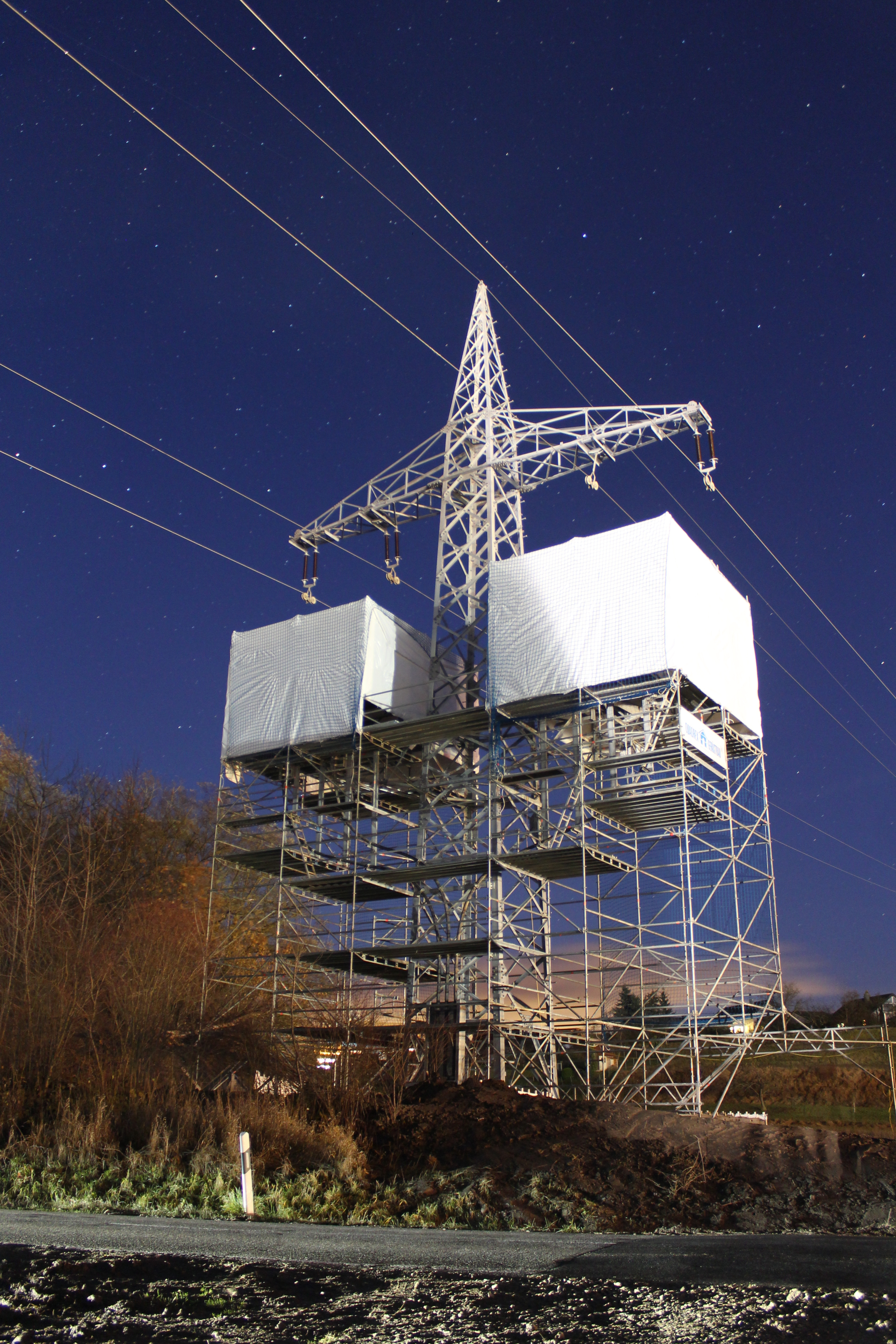
Future termination tower of a 110 kV-line while joins are installed

A special kind of a dead-end tower is a termination pylon, also called a terminal tower. It is used when the overhead power line terminates, and is connected to substation equipment, or transitions to underground cable. For voltages below 30 kV also pylon transformers are used.

== Long spans ==
For crossings of large bodies of water, wide freeways, or valleys, where the span width of the conductors is very long, specific constructions must be used to achieve a wider distance between the conductors, mostly to prevent short-circuits which may occur when conductors come in contact with one another due to wind or other interferences. These towers may be built as H-frame towers, or may have each conductor placed on a single tower or mast. In every case, these towers are built to be more stable than most of the other towers used, as the wide span between towers means that much greater forces are placed on them.

== Switch pylon ==
Anchor pylons may also have a switch attached to their crossbeam. These so-called switch pylons are operated from the ground by the use of long rods. The attachment of circuit breakers to pylons is only practical when voltages are less than 50 kV.

== Sequences ==
Sequences of two or more strainer pylons are uncommon in a powerline because strainers require twice as many strain insulators as ordinary pylons. Longer wire sections thus reduce installation work and cost. Sequences of strainers are sometimes used at powerlines crossing valleys, or where the powerline runs a path with curves.

== See also ==
- Suspension tower
- Transposition tower
