= Overhead cable =

Cable used for transmission of information on utility poles

An overhead cable is a cable for the transmission of information, laid on utility poles. Overhead telephone and cable TV lines are common in North America. These poles sometimes carry overhead power lines for the supply of electric power. Power supply companies may also use them for an in-house communication network. Sometimes these cables are integrated in the ground or power conductor. Otherwise an additional line is strung on the pylons, usually on the body of the pylon in the height of a crossbar. At several lines built by the former power supply company EVS (now part of EnBW) in Baden-Württemberg, Germany, such cables are attached like a garland on the ground conductor or on an auxiliary rope. Although many of these cables were replaced by ground conductors with integrated communication cable or free-spun communication cables many of these cables are still in use.

Cables are arranged on poles with the most dangerous cables, that is, those carrying power, strung highest. Overhead cable systems also include a number of different components for managing signal cables. These include splicing systems that allow multi-conductor cables for distributing telephone signals and snowshoe-shaped devices for reversing the direction of cables.

When metal-based telephone wires are strung on the same utility poles as the power lines, they can pick up noise from the power line. Modern fiber optic telephone cable has the advantage that it can be strung next to power lines without interference.

In heavily populated regions of the UK, the only overhead cable that would be visible is the telephone line. Power cables and fiber-optic cables that deliver television and broadband services are buried underground. The lesser populated regions of the UK, the countryside for example, will have overhead power cables. Although it is safer to keep the cables underground, it would be difficult to repair a line if a fault were to develop.

== Gallery ==
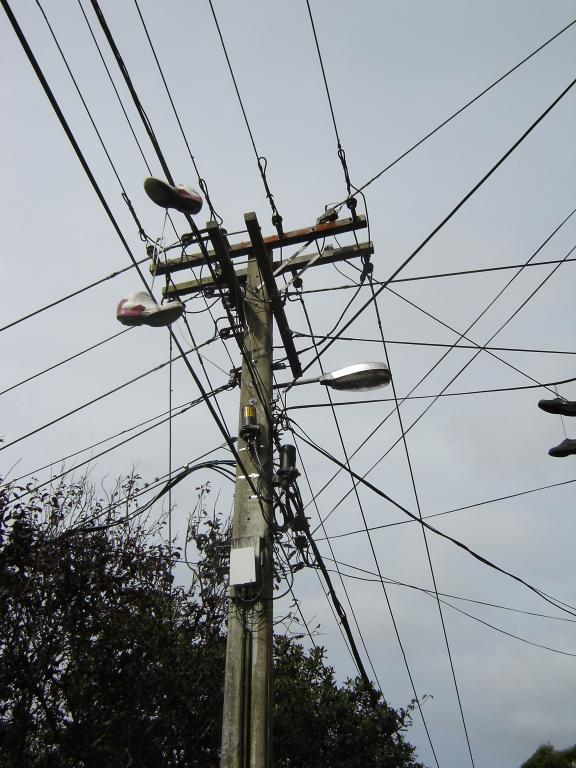
Pole carrying electricity, Cable TV, and telephone equipment (top to bottom), in New Zealand. Two pairs of shoes can be seen hanging from wires.

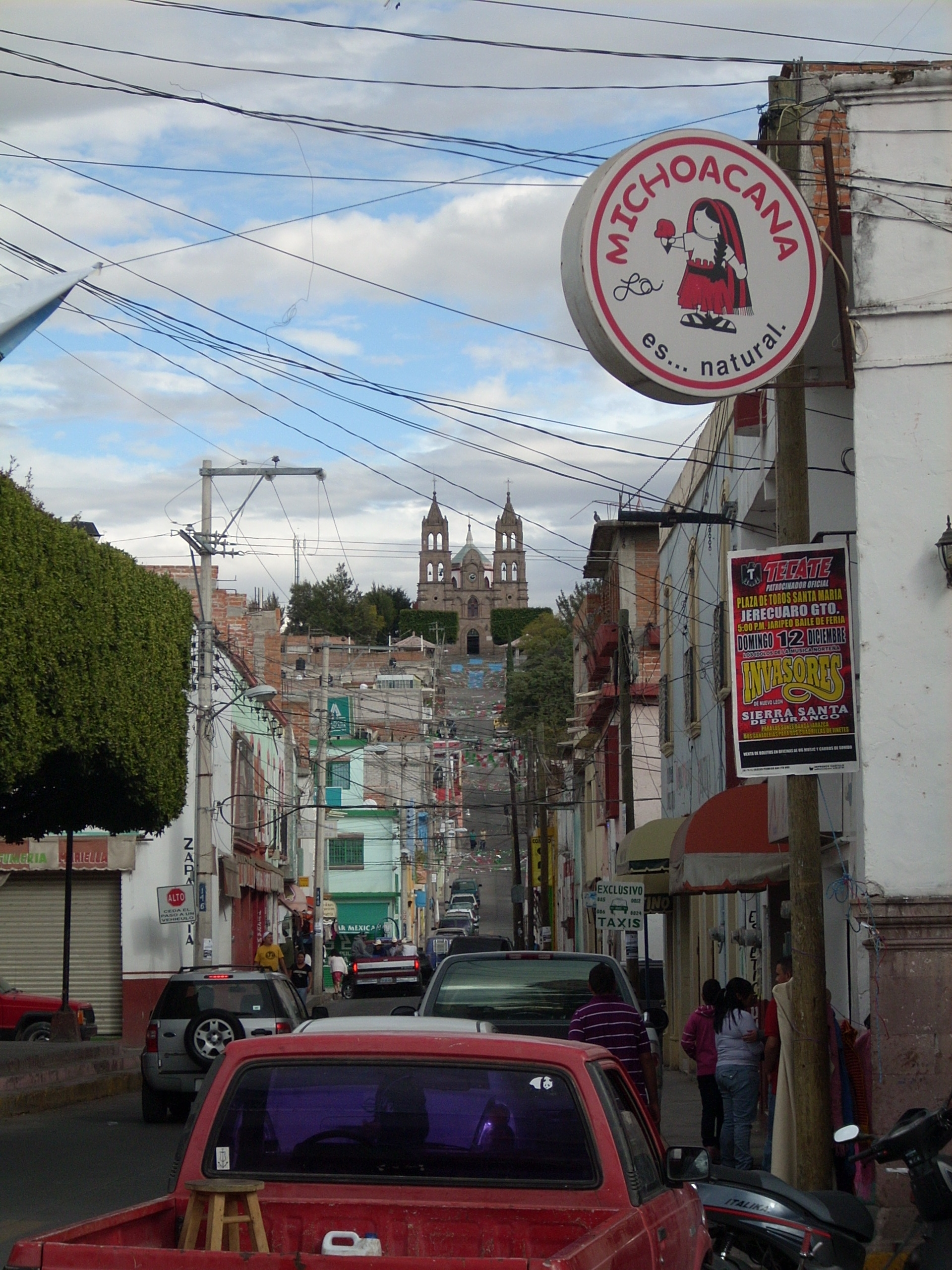
Multiple overhead cables above a street in Mexico.

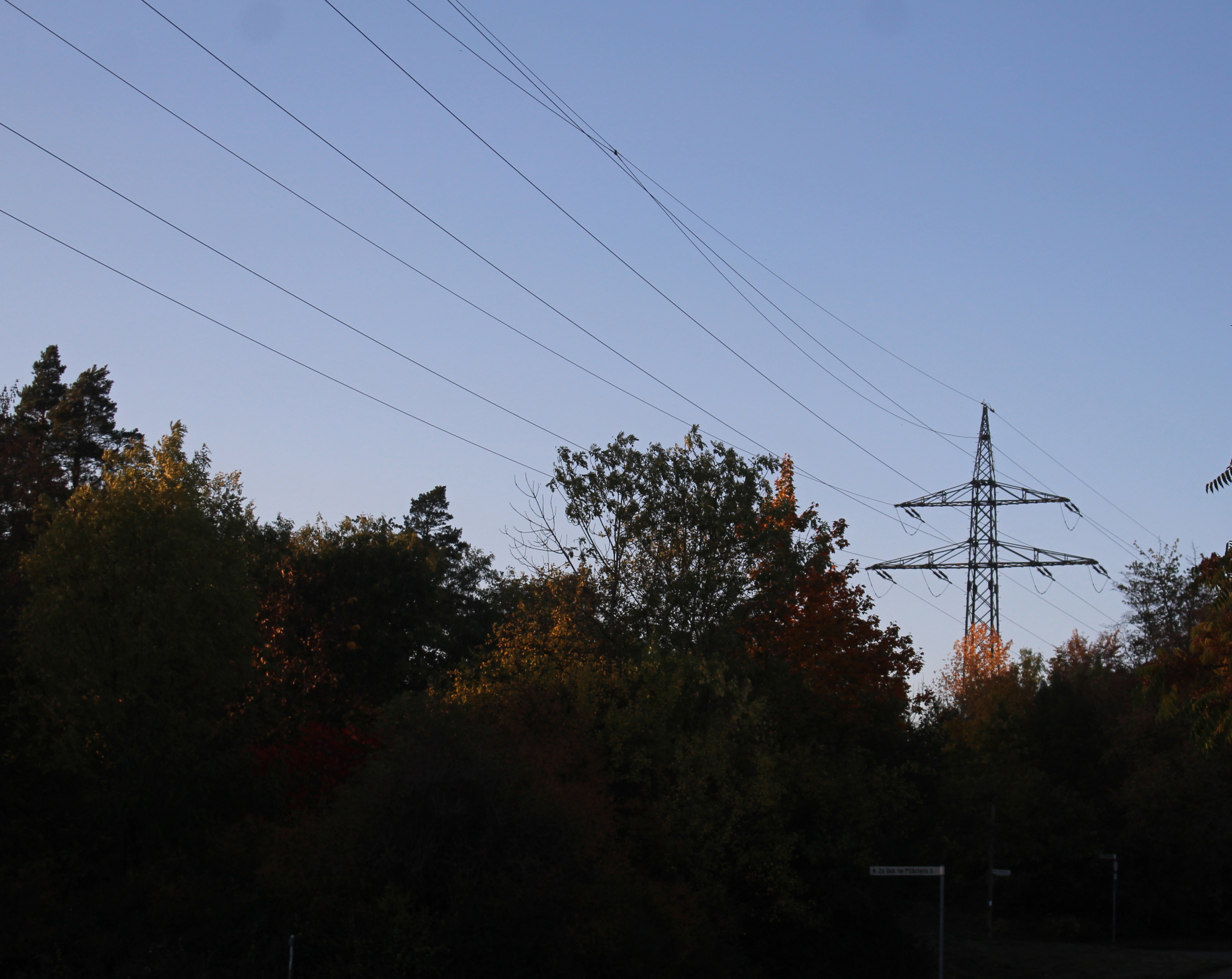
Garland-like communication cable on the ground conductor of a 110 kV-line

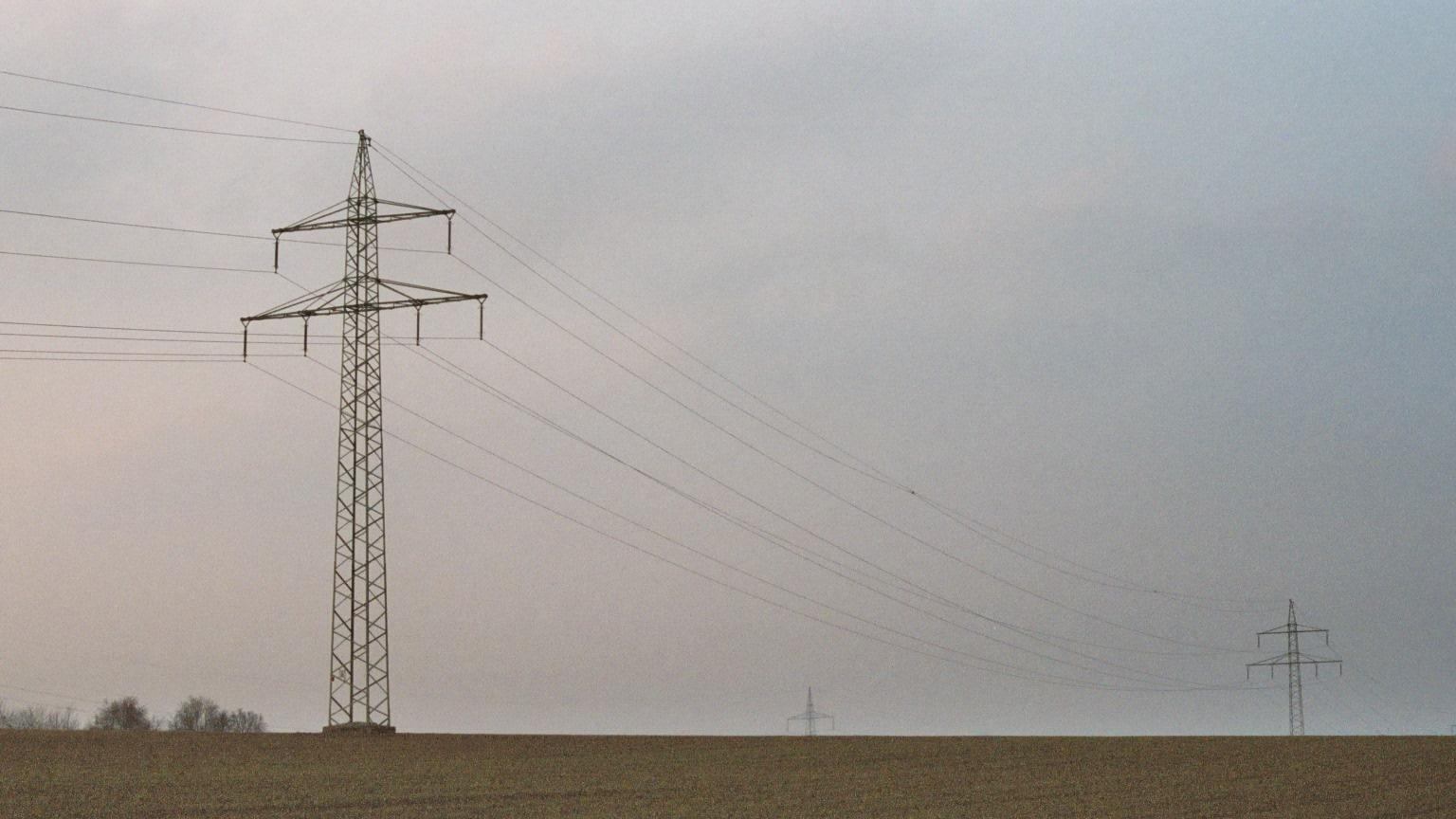
Suspension towers with garland-like communication cable on the ground conductor

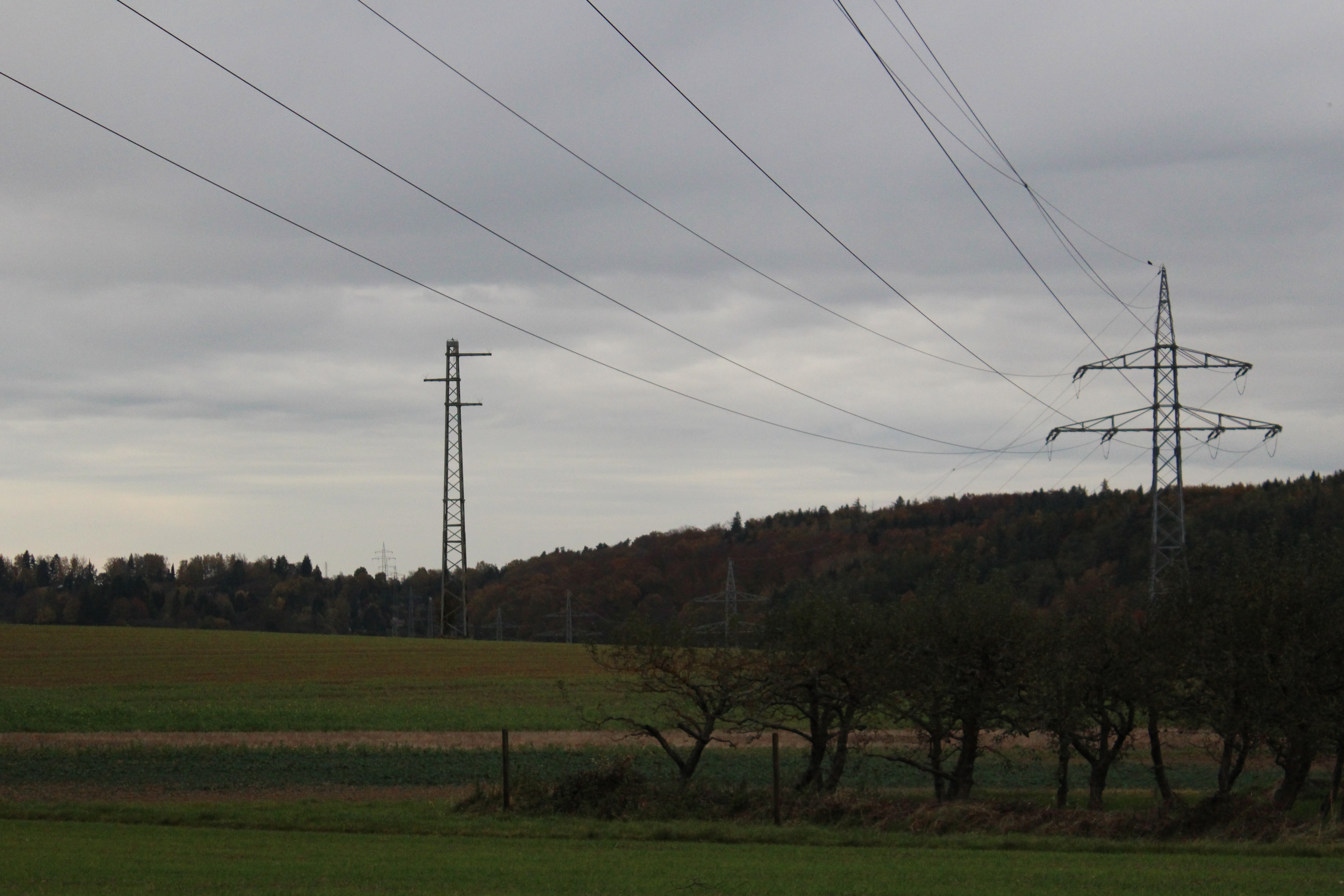
Strainer with garland-like communication cable on the ground conductor

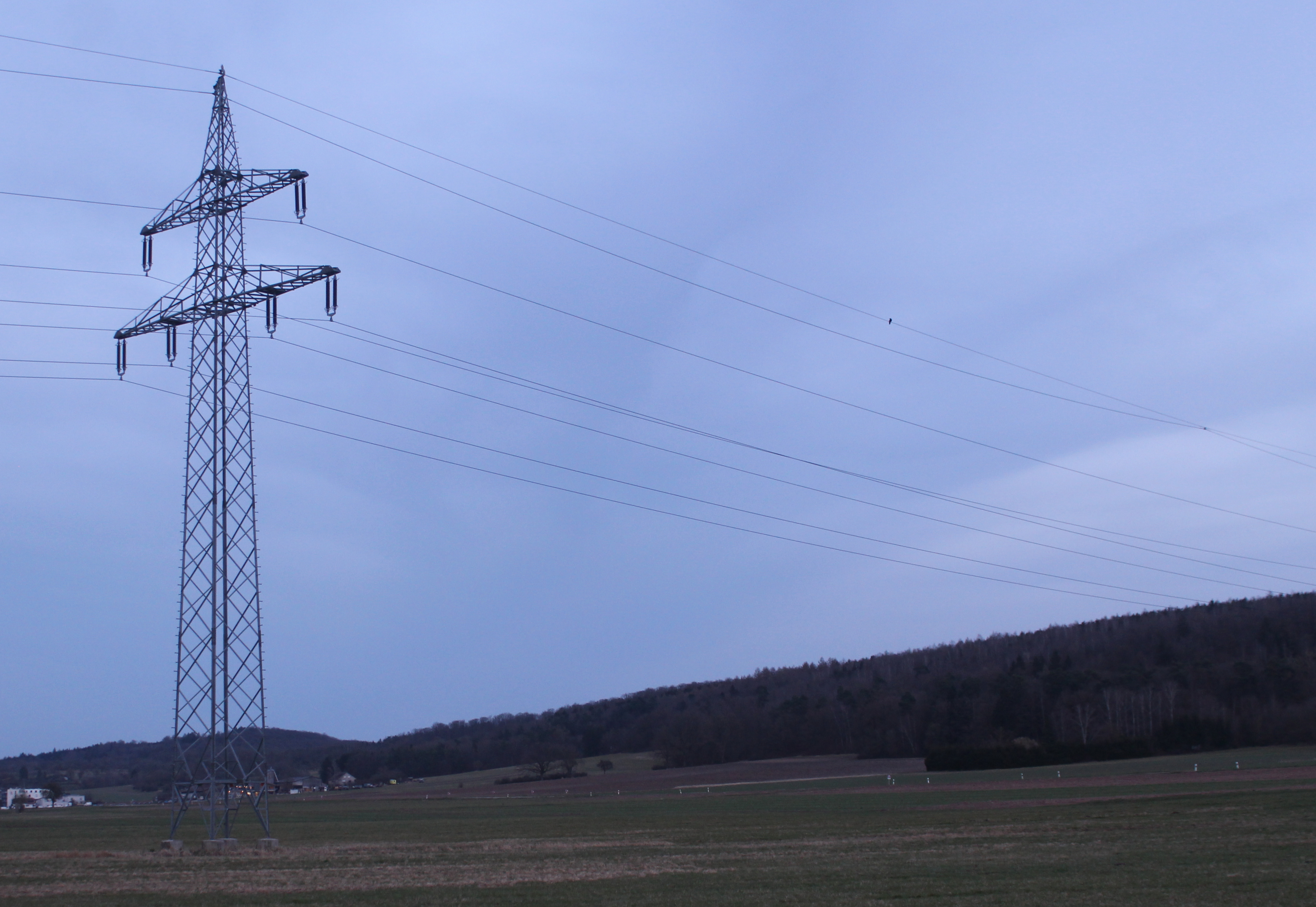
Suspension tower of a 110 kV-line with garland-like communication cable on the ground conductor

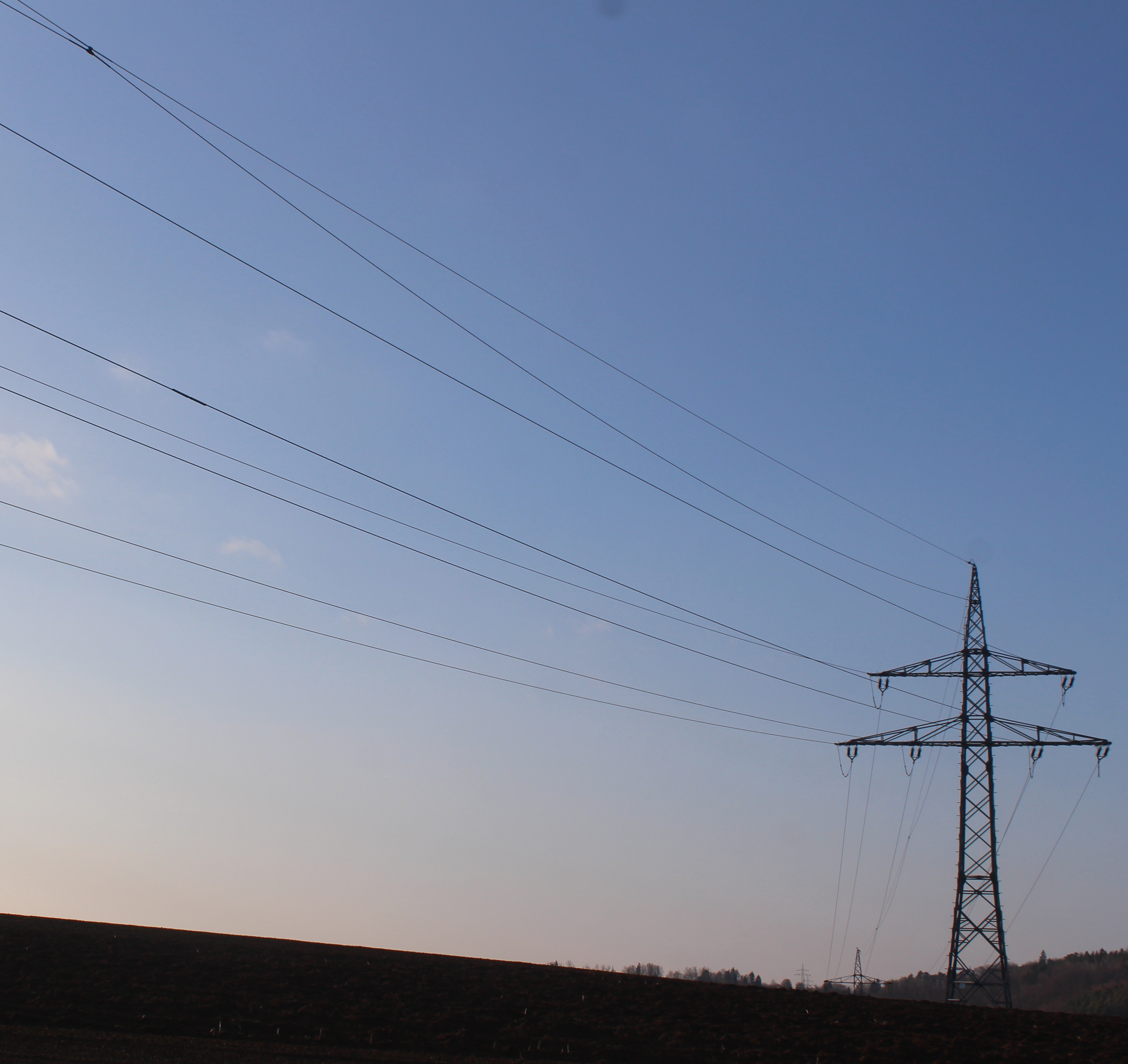
Strainer of a 110 kV-line with garland-like communication cable on the ground conductor

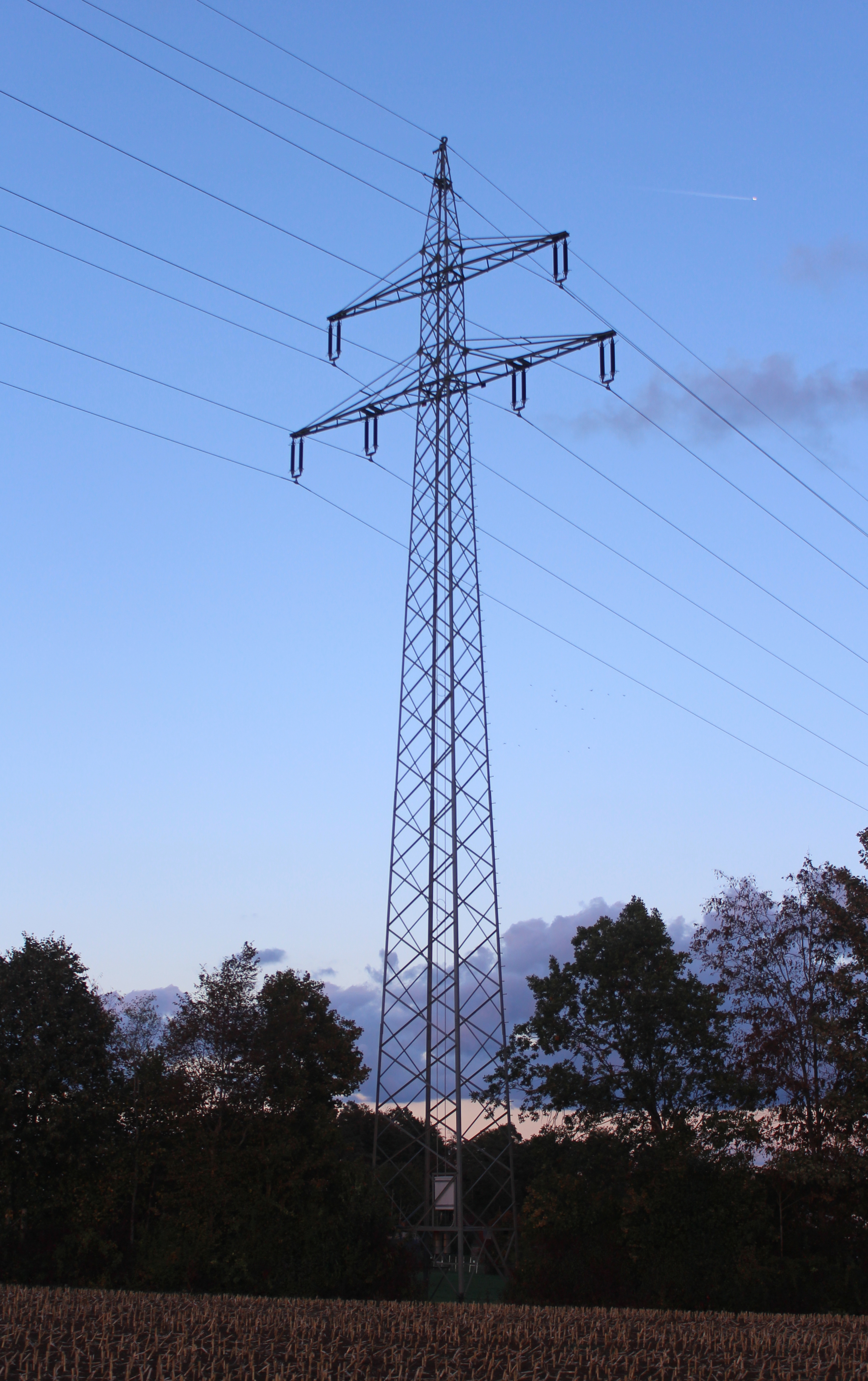
Suspension tower of a 110 kV-line with anchorage of garland-like communication cable on the ground conductor and its conduction downward in the body of the tower

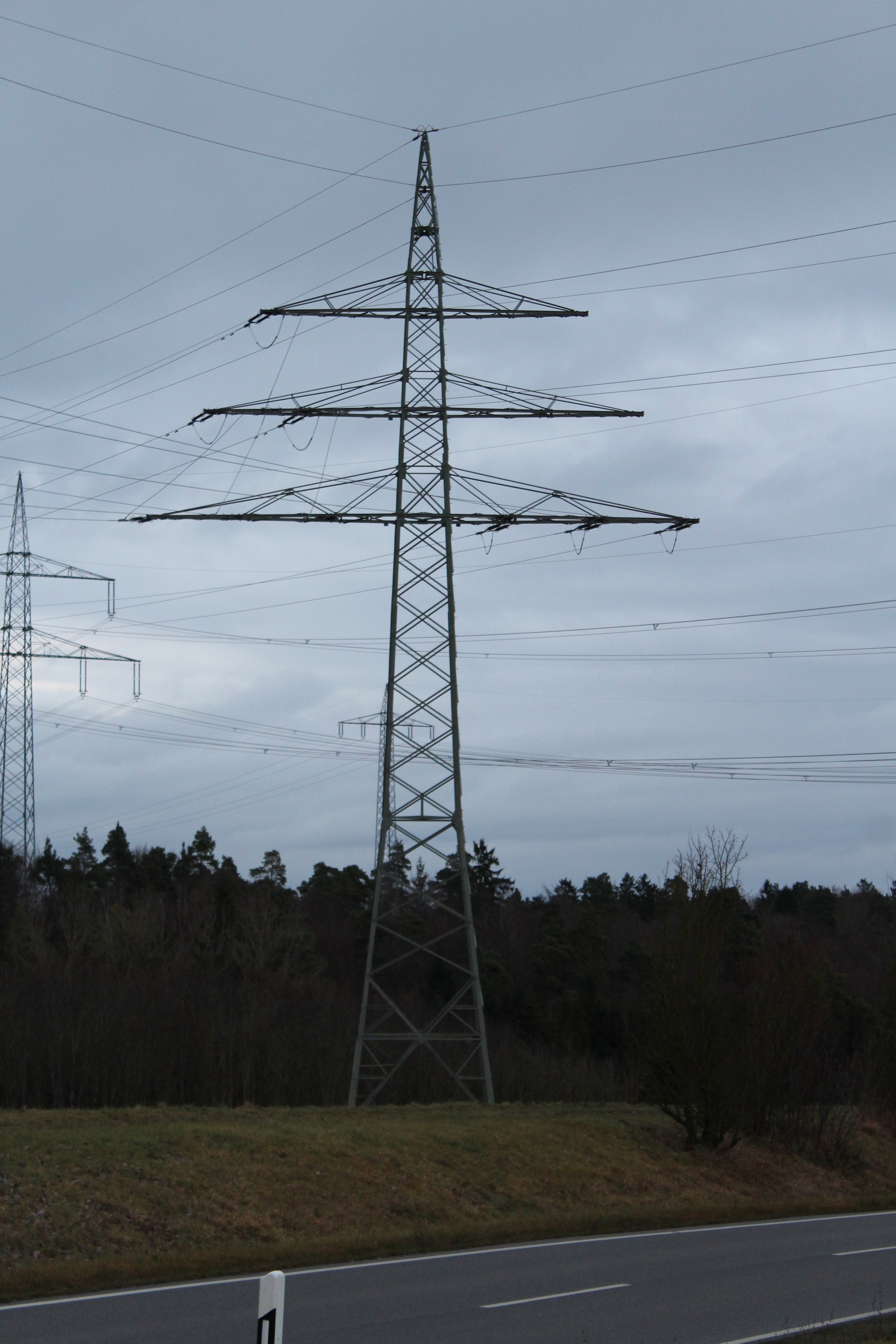
Branch pylon of a 110 kV-line with garland-like communication cables

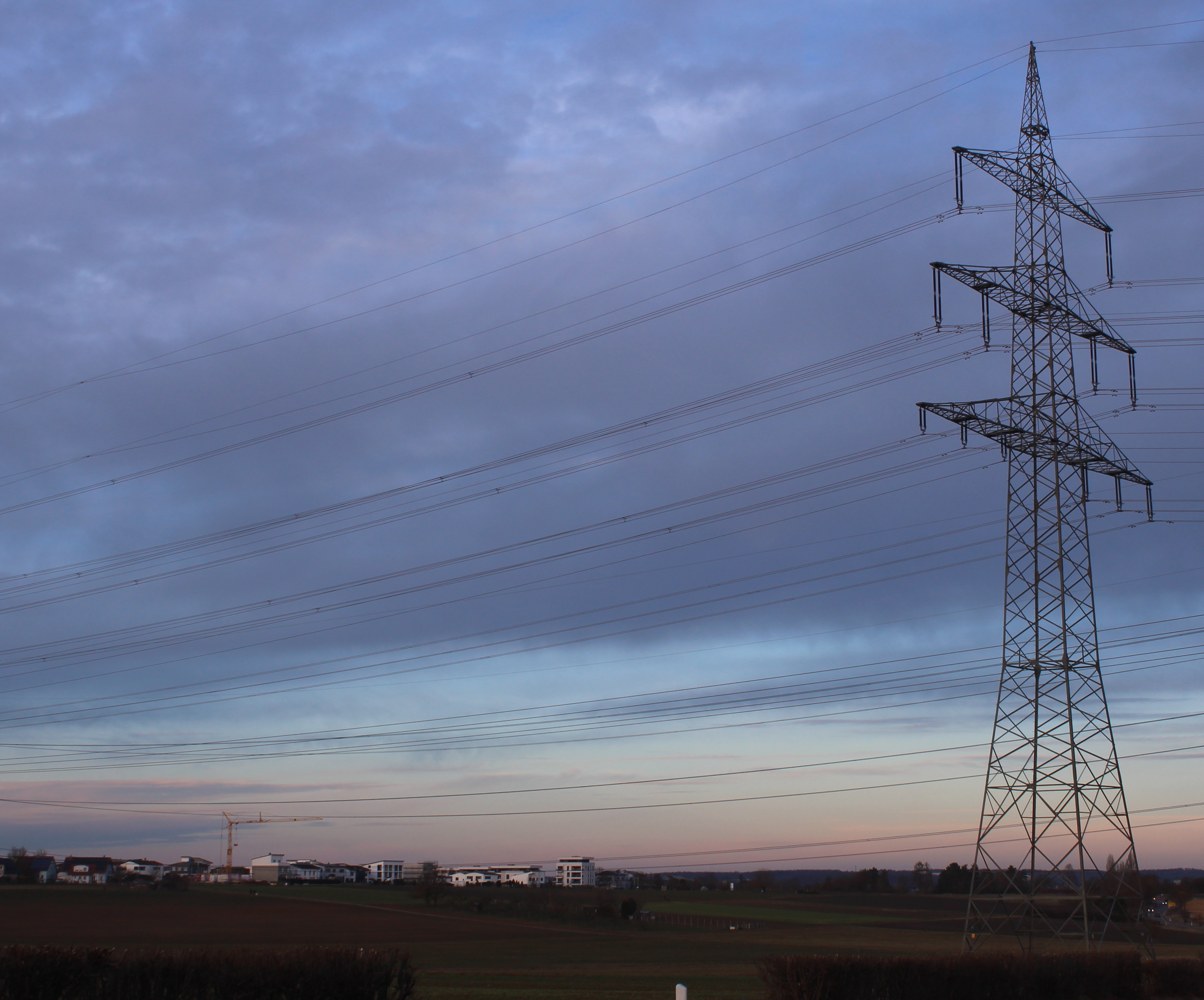
380 kV/110 kV-line with two garland-like communication cables one on the ground conductor and one on an auxiliary rope

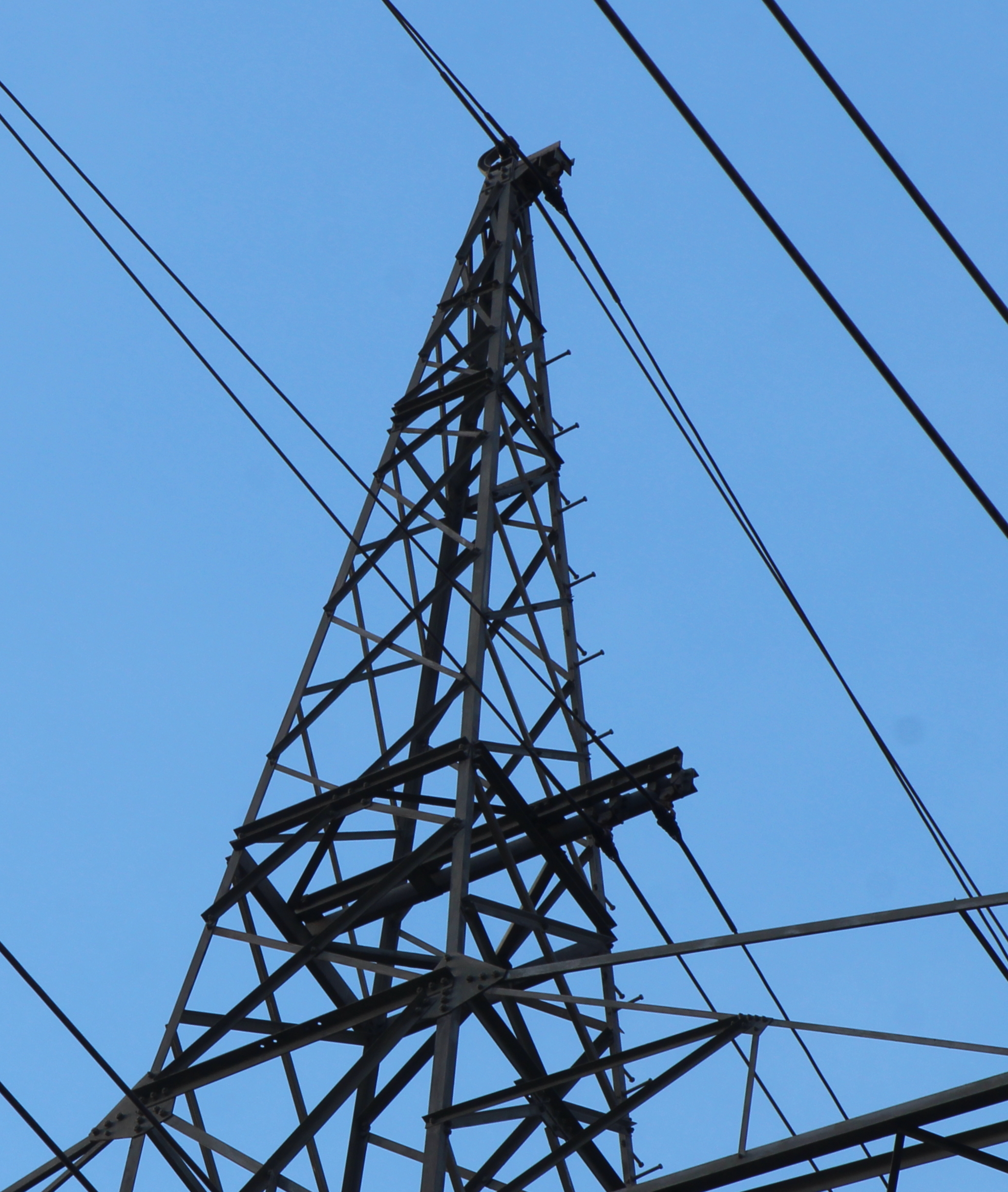
Detail view of a pinnacle of a pylon equipped with two garland-like communication cables

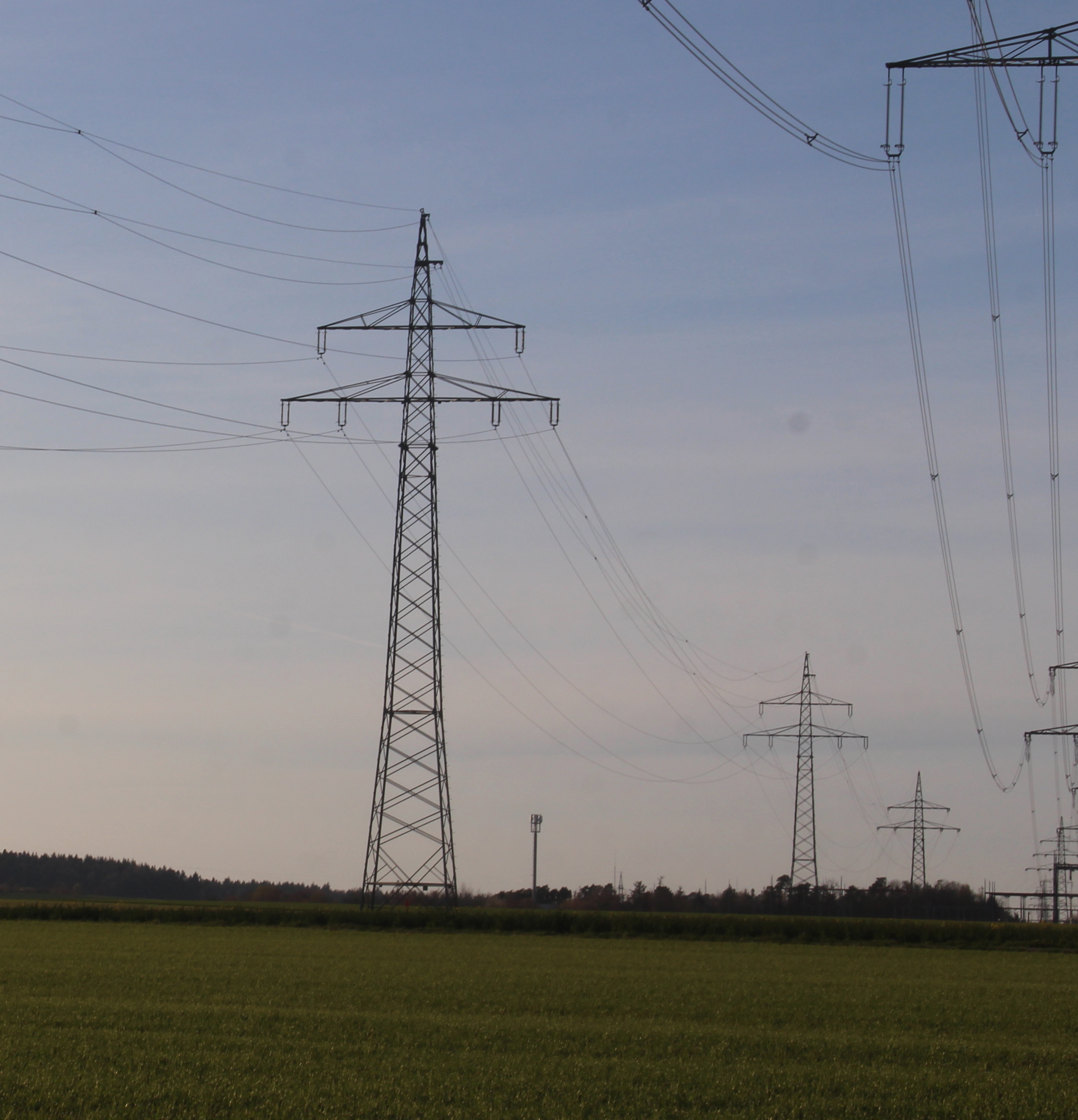
110 kV-line with two garland-like communication cables one on the ground conductor and one on an auxiliary rope

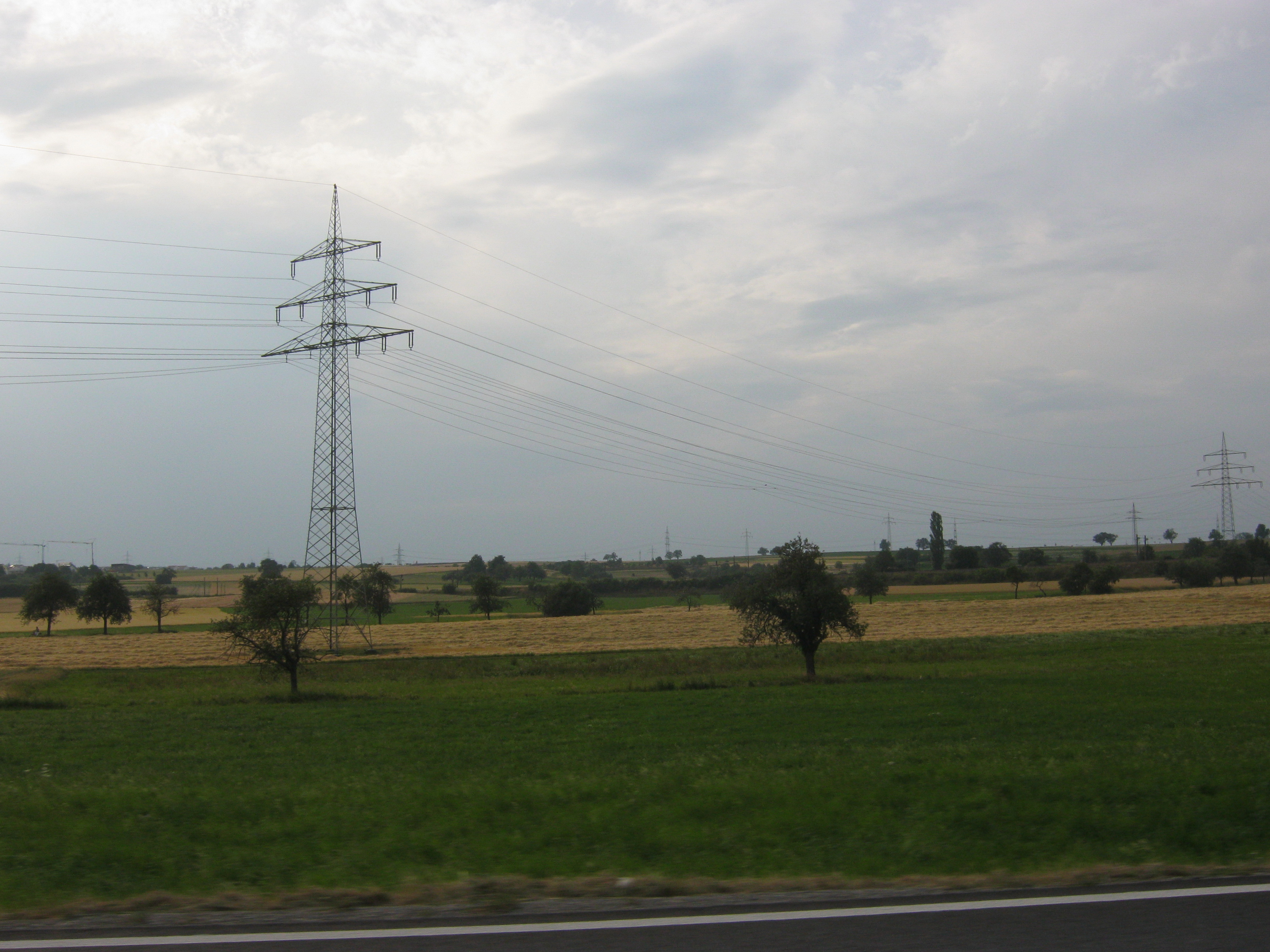
110 kV-line north of Herrenberg with two garland-like communication cables on the lowest crossbar

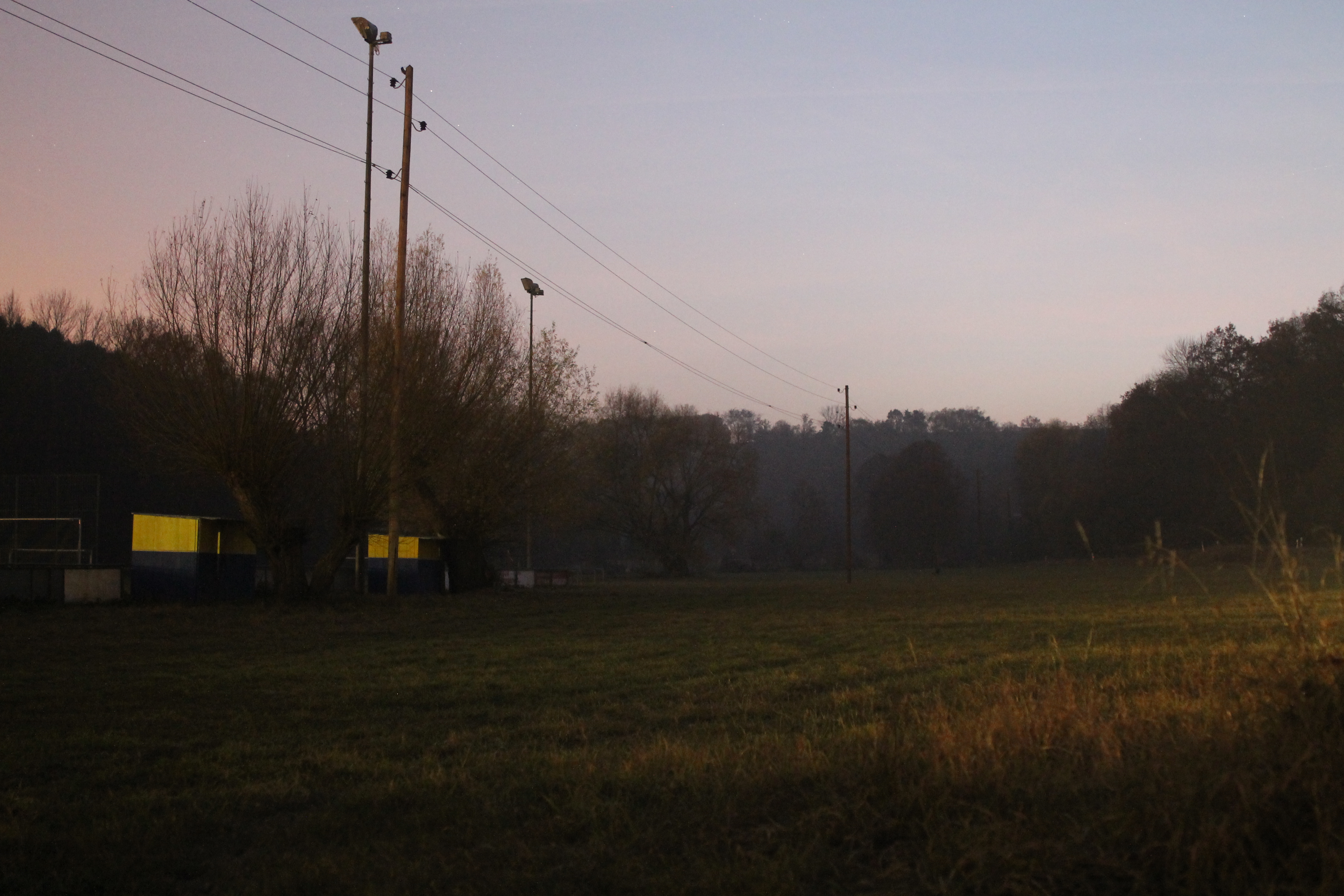
Medium voltage line with garland-like communication cable on a conductor

== See also ==
- Aerial cable
- Optical ground wire
- Optical attached cable
- Open wire
