= Derek Harrison =

Derek Harrison may refer to:

- Derek Harrison (cyclist) (born 1944), British Olympic cyclist
- Derek Harrison (footballer) (born 1950), English footballer
- Derek Harrison (speedway rider) (born 1959), British speedway rider
- Derek Harrison (police officer) (1927–2011), British police officer

== See also ==
- Derrick Harrison (1929–1967), rugby league footballer of the 1950s
