= John Kay (journalist, born 1943) =

British journalist (1943–2021)

- Born: John Michael Kay; 28 October 1943; Golders Green, London, England
- Died: 7 May 2021 (aged 77); Hertford, Hertfordshire, England
- Education: Bootham School
- Alma mater: Hatfield College, Durham
- Occupation: Journalist for The Sun
- Spouses: Harue Nonaka (m. 1976; died 1977); Mercedes Kay (m. 1979; died 2017)
- Writing career
- Language: English
- Period: 1963–2015
- Notable awards: 'Reporter of the Year', British Press Awards (twice)
John Kay
- Motive: Attempted murder-suicide
- Conviction: Manslaughter on the grounds of diminished responsibility
- Criminal charges: Murder
Details
- Victims: Harue Kay
- Date: 1977

John Michael Kay (28 October 1943 – 7 May 2021) was a British journalist who worked for The Sun newspaper for several decades. In 1977 he killed his wife, was convicted of manslaughter on the grounds of diminished responsibility, and admitted to a psychiatric hospital for treatment. He was twice named 'Reporter of the Year' in the British Press Awards.

== Early life ==
Kay was born in Golders Green, London on 28 October 1943. Kay's father, Ernest Kay, was managing editor of the London Evening News, and his mother was Martha (née Pilkington). The younger Kay was educated at Bootham School in York and continued his studies at Durham University (Hatfield College), where he served as Editor of Palatinate during Michaelmas term of 1963, having previously been News Editor.

His time as Editor was eventful. He was accused of falsely reporting a profit to the Student Union for one edition of the paper when it had in reality made a loss, but was ultimately cleared of deliberately making the claim. An article he produced on 'black magic ceremonies' also attracted controversy, and was described as a "nasty piece of pornography" by the Pro Vice-Chancellor of the university. Despite this, the Student Representatives' Council (SRC), responsible for publishing Palatinate, gave Kay a vote of confidence and allowed him to continue as Editor, while condemning the offending article.

== Career ==
After graduating from Durham, Kay gained his first job in journalism with The Journal in nearby Newcastle, where he was an Editorial writer (1965–67); Chief Industrial Correspondent (1967–68); and Deputy News Editor (1968–1970). After a spell in London as a features writer for Thomson Newspapers, he returned to The Journal in 1971 to serve as Business Editor. He began working for The Sun newspaper from 1974, initially as a general reporter, then as Industrial Editor.

According to his obituary in The Times, some of Kay's methods involved "treading a fine line between journalistic licence and dishonesty". In 1983, he was reprimanded by the Press Council for falsely claiming to have had a "world exclusive" interview with Maria McKay, the widow of a Falklands VC. She had sold her story to the rival Daily Mirror tabloid.

He was appointed The Sun's chief reporter in 1990. According to freelance journalist Rob McGibbon in the Press Gazette obituary of Kay, Roy Greenslade, while he was editor of the Daily Mirror, tried to recruit the journalist, but Kay remained at The Sun with a large pay rise and a company car. Twice named 'Reporter of the Year' in the British Press Awards, a Press Gazette feature in November 2005 identified him as the sixteenth most influential British journalist since the war.

The Press Gazette reported in November 2008 that Kay had been persuaded to continue working on The Sun past retirement on a full-time freelance basis but on the same salary as before.

In February 2012, Kay was reported by BBC News to be one of eight people arrested as part of the Operation Elveden investigation into alleged bribes to police and civil servants. Kay was cleared at the Old Bailey in March 2015 of paying a total of £100,000 over a decade to a Ministry of Defence member of staff for assistance on stories relating to the army. The Sun though, did pay the money to his source, Bettina Jordan-Barber, who was jailed for 12 months in January for misconduct in public office. Kay left The Sun in 2015 and retired.

In 1979, he married his Spanish-born wife, Mercedes, a PA for the Iberia airline. After he severed all ties with The Sun, he cared for her at their home in North London; she died in 2017 from cancer.

== Manslaughter of first wife ==
In 1977, Kay killed his Japanese-born first wife, Harue (née Nonaka), by drowning her in the bath. After several attempts to kill himself, the police found him in his car naked and covered in blood. He was arrested and charged with murder.

Defended at trial by John Mathew QC, paid for by The Sun, he pleaded guilty to manslaughter on the grounds of diminished responsibility. Mathew argued that Kay lacked confidence when going 'on the road' to interview people and said that prior to the incident, Kay suffered a nervous breakdown, locking himself in his hotel room shortly before the 1977 TUC Congress in Blackpool. Returning home after the conference, Kay said he felt unable to resign because it would harm his career, but knew he was not capable of functioning as Industrial Editor either. He said that he announced to Harue that he was going to kill himself. After drowning her, he said he attempted to kill himself through several methods including hanging, jumping out of a window, and finally driving his car head-on into a bridge.

The court accepted Kay's account of the events and Sun editor Larry Lamb wrote a letter to St Albans Crown Court to say there would always be a job open for Kay with the newspaper. The judge ordered Kay to be admitted to a psychiatric hospital in Friern Barnet. After a spell of treatment he was taken back on by The Sun on condition that he be confined to the office.

== Death ==
Kay died at a nursing home in Hertford on 7 May 2021 after a fall. Upon his death, The Sun published a two-page spread calling him "the greatest journalist of his generation" and "everybody's mate", and a Daily Telegraph obituary described him as the "brilliant Sun chief reporter famed for his scoops, exposés and effortless mastery of tabloid-speak", while Tom Newton Dunn wrote a piece for the Evening Standard criticising Sir Keir Starmer for prosecuting Kay on bribery charges in 2015, all without touching on his manslaughter conviction (The Sun and Evening Standard added mentions of the killing to the obituaries after initial publication).
