= Edwin K. Townsend-Coles =

British adult literacy expert (1922-2003)

Edwin Keith Townsend-Coles (1922 – 25 July 2003) was a specialist in adult literacy. Townsend-Coles was educated at Durham University (St John's College), where he read Geography. While at Durham he was Editor-in-Chief of Palatinate and President of the Durham Union Society during Easter term of 1951. Townsend-Coles pursued a career in the field of adult education, and was Director of the Institute of Adult Education, University College of Rhodesia and Nyasaland from 1958-1965. After moving back to England, he took up a position as an adult education adviser at Rewley House in Oxford. He became a prominent figure in the Delegacy for Extra Mural Studies at the University of Oxford. Townsend-Coles spent the latter part of his career working for UNESCO, visiting developing parts of the world. While living in Oxford he held the position of chairman of the Oxford Civic Society between 1983 until 2000.

== Publications ==
- Adult Education in Developing Countries (1969)
- Maverick of the education family: two essays in non-formal education (1982)
- The story of education in Botswana (1985)
- Education in Botswana: 1966, 1986, 2006 (1986)
- Let the People Learn: Establishment of a Department of Non-formal Education in Botswana (1988)
