= Ralph Hann =

English footballer and trainer (1911–1990)

Personal information
- Date of birth: 4 July 1911
- Place of birth: Whitburn, England
- Date of death: 17 July 1990 (aged 79)
- Place of death: Derby, England
- Height: 5 ft 9 1/2 in (1.77 m)
- Position: Wing-half

Youth career
- Marsden Colliery
- 1929–1930: Sunderland

Senior career*
Years	Team	Apps	(Gls)
1930	Sunderland		
1930–1932	Newcastle United		
1932–1939	Derby County	115	(0)
- → Notts County (wartime guest)
1947	Crystal Palace	1	(0)
- * Club domestic league appearances and goals

Ralph Hann (4 July 1911 – 17 July 1990) was an English professional footballer and trainer. As a player, he played as wing-half and after retirement, worked as a trainer at various clubs but the majority of his playing and training career were served at Derby County.

== Playing career ==
=== Early career ===
Hann was born in Whitburn, near Sunderland and began his junior career playing with Whitburn St Mary's, then members of the Sunderland J.O.C. League and then he moved to Marsden Colliery as a left half. In 1929, he signed as an amateur with Sunderland and in December that year, signed professional with the club after showing promise with the reserve team. He was released by the club at the end of the season and shortly after was offered a trial with fellow North East club Newcastle United, who offered him a contract where he played with the reserve team for two seasons.

=== Derby County ===
In March 1932, Hann joined Derby County along with Duncan Hutchison for £3,100 and made his first team debut a year later on 11 March 1933 against Huddersfield Town. Derby were mainstays in the top half of the First Division during Hann's time with the club and he struggled to hold down a regular place in the team. He had few playing opportunities until the 1934–35 season, although had already showed his worth by covering various defensive positions in the seasons prior. The best league placement Derby achieved in this spell was a runners-up spot to Hann's former club Sunderland in the 1935–36 league championship, earning Hann a runners-up medal.

In the 1938–39 season, Hann was an ever-present in the Derby side playing all 42 league matches and one FA Cup tie. The following season was cut short due to World War II and Hann's professional league career ended due to the hiatus the war caused to professional football in England. He also played for Notts County as a wartime guest. In total, he played around 160 senior games for Derby, 115 of these in the league.

== Trainer career ==
After the war ended and professional football resumed, Hann became a trainer, working as a trainer at Crystal Palace from September 1946, where he also registered as a player in April 1947. He then became trainer-masseur at Luton Town in April 1947.

In November 1953, he rejoined former club Derby County as head trainer when former teammate Jack Barker was appointed first team manager and retained this role under subsequent managers Harry Storer and Tim Ward. Hann was relieved of his duties in May 1967, when new Derby manager Brian Clough replaced Hann with Peter Taylor. Hann described his dismissal as a "body blow" and was reportedly shocked by the announcement, which came despite the players speaking in support of him. In later life, he offered physiotherapy to local footballers.

== Personal life ==
Hann was the son of a miner. He had a daughter, Judith who became longest-serving presenter of Tomorrow's World on the BBC.

== Death ==
Hann, died on 17 July 1990, in Derby aged 79.
