= John Exelby =

British television executive (died 2019)

John Exelby (1940/1941 – November 15, 2019) was co-founder of BBC World Service TV News.

Exelby studied for a politics degree at Durham University and became editor of Palatinate. He also served as President of the Durham Union. After leaving university he worked at The Northern Echo newspaper before joining BBC Television news where he was news editor, editor of most of the major news programmes and co-founder and managing editor of BBC World TV News. He was married to Judith Hann, a former presenter of Tomorrow's World for 20 years. Together, they ran a media company based in the Cotswolds.

He died on 15 November 2019 at the age of 78.
