= All-dielectric self-supporting cable =

Type of fibre optic cable

All-dielectric self-supporting (ADSS) cable is a type of optical fiber cable that is strong enough to support itself between structures without using conductive metal elements. It is used by electrical utility companies as a communications medium, installed along existing overhead transmission lines and often sharing the same support structures as the electrical conductors.

ADSS is an alternative to OPGW and OPAC with lower installation cost. The cables are designed to be strong enough to allow lengths of up to 700 metres to be installed between support towers. ADSS cable is designed to be lightweight and small in diameter to reduce the load on tower structures due to cable weight, wind, and ice.

In the design of the cable, the internal glass optical fibers are supported with little or no strain, to maintain low optical loss throughout the life of the cable. The cable is jacketed to prevent moisture from degrading the fibers. The jacket also protects the polymer strength elements from the effect of solar ultraviolet light.

Using single-mode fibers and light wavelengths of either 1310 or 1550 nanometres, circuits up to 100 km long are possible without repeaters. A single cable can carry as many as 864 fibers.

== Construction details ==
No metal wires are used in an ADSS cable. Optical fibers are either supported in loose buffer tubes, or arranged in a ribbon configuration. To prevent strain on the fibers, most types provide the fibres with excess slack length compared to the length of the supporting member.

For longer spans, the most common design gets its strength from aramid fiber yarns, which are coated to prevent water wicking. The aramid yarn strength member surrounds a core made up of multiple buffer tubes, each containing multiple fibers, all surrounding a plastic core. The outer sheath provides protection from water and sunlight. Another version consists of a large central tube containing multiple flat, thin structures called fiber ribbons; these consists of 6 or 12 fibers laminated between layers of a tape-like material.

Another type of design uses four glass-reinforced plastic strength member strands, and loose buffer tubes cabled into an assembly and protected by a jacket.

== Accessories and installation ==
Fittings used with ADSS cable may be tension type, used at dead-ends where the cable terminates or changes direction, or may be suspension type, only holding the weight of a span with tension transmitted through the next span of cable. Reinforcing rods are used at dead-ends and may sometimes be used on either side of a suspension support. Wind-induced aeolian vibration may be a factor on longer spans since ADSS cables have light weight, relatively high tension, and little self-damping. Anti-vibration dampers may be installed on each span near the support points if needed. Accessories must not be clamped directly to the cable but instead over reinforcing rods, to protect the cable from electrical and mechanical damage. Termination boxes are used to enclose and protect splices between the ADSS cable and "inside plant" cable runs.

ADSS cable can be installed using live-line methods on an energized transmission line. Fiber cables are generally supported on the lower cross-arms of the tower, which provides good clearance to the ground. When the fibers are installed in the middle of a tower, the fiber cable is unlikely to hit energized conductors. Lower weights and forces are used for installation, compared with metallic cables, so lighter equipment can be used.

Installation technique is similar to installing overhead conductors, with care taken to prevent excessively tight bending of the cable, and adjustment of the sag of individual spans as for metallic cables.

== Application issues ==
Cables must be designed for the worst-case combinations of temperature, ice load, and wind. An installed cable must not sag so low that it can be damaged by traffic under the line. On long spans where utilities already experience conductor galloping caused by sustained high wind, dampers may need to be installed on ADSS cable also. The cable specifications should allow for operation at the lowest expected temperature.

Transmission lines are sometimes exposed to damage by gunfire, especially in rural areas. Shotgun pellets may occasionally sever fibers or damage the sheath, allowing water into the cable. This is usually in areas where ADSS cables are strung low over known hunting areas.

Glass under tension and exposed to acid environments loses strength; this applies to both the optical fibers and the glass reinforcement of polymers. The cable jacket and gel coating of fibres provides protection from chemical attack.

The ADSS cable is suspended in the electrical field due to the phase conductors; this varies from a maximum at mid-span to zero at the grounded metal supports of the cable. In dry conditions, no current flows on the jacket of the cable, but moisture reduces the jacket insulation. Uneven distribution of moisture can result in formation of high-resistance "dry bands" which have a relatively high voltage across them. Dry bands tend to form at the supports. Voltage across the dry band can cause carbon tracks to form and erosion of the jacket material. If the voltage across the dry band is high enough, an arc may form which can damage the jacket. Dry-band arcing is more likely for cables installed under higher transmission voltage lines (220 kV and above). Even a few incidents of arcing along a dry band can cause severe permanent damage to the jacket, leading to subsequent failure of the cable. Relatively low sustained arc currents of a few milliamperes can cause eventual aging degradation of the cable. The magnitude of current available in an arc (and probability of damage) depends on the geometry of the installation and is not simply correlated with the voltage of the transmission line. Wet conditions near industrial plants or saltwater will have more severe effect on the jacket resistance than in freshwater rain or fog. The two usual means of protecting cables from dry-banding damage in very high voltage environments involve using a tracking-resistant cable jacket material and relocating the cable to more favorable locations on the structure.
