= Judith Hann =

English broadcaster

- Born: 8 September 1942 (age 84); Littleover, Derby, United Kingdom
- Occupation: Television presenter
- Employer: BBC

Judith Hann (born 8 September 1942) is a broadcaster and writer specialising in science, food and the environment.

== Early life and education ==
Hann's father was the former Derby County footballer and trainer Ralph Hann.

Hann attended the University of Durham, where she edited Palatinate, the university newspaper, for two terms in 1963.

== Life and career ==
Hann presented Tomorrow's World on BBC Television between 1974 and 1994, making her the programme's longest-serving presenter. She has since made television guest appearances, and also some TV commercials. In 1997, she appeared in a Shredded Wheat advertisement, in which she used her scientific judgement to inform viewers that the product could possibly help keep their hearts healthy. In 2006, she presented Two's A Crowd, a series on BBC Radio 4 that searched for the secrets of human identity. She runs her own media training and presentation skills company.

== Personal life ==
Hann lives on a farm near the small town of Lechlade, Gloucestershire, in the Cotswolds. She has written a book and taught courses about herbs, and grows many varieties of them in her garden.

Hann was married to John Exelby, a former executive at BBC News, who died in November 2019; they had two sons, and now have two grandchildren.

== Television appearances ==
- Tomorrow's World (BBC1) presenter (1974–1994) (she was the show's longest-serving presenter)
- The Risk Business (BBC1) – presenter (1980)
- Not with a Bang (ITV) as herself (1990)
- Shooting Stars with Vic Reeves and Bob Mortimer (BBC2) – Episode 3.7 (1997) as herself
- Tomorrow's World Live (BBC4) – one-off special (2018) co-presenter

== Books ==
- How Science Works ISBN 0-7513-0832-3 (1991).
- The Food of Love ISBN 1-85225-025-9 (1987).
- Judith Hann's Total Health Plan ISBN 0-552-99242-9 (1984).
- But What About the Children? A Working Parents' Guide to Child Care ISBN 0-370-10441-2 (1976).
- The Family Scientist ISBN 0-354-04361-7 (1979).
- The Perfect Baby? ISBN 0-297-78125-1 (1982).
- Herbs ISBN 1848993439 (2017).
