= Derek Harrison (police officer) =

British police officer

Derek Harrison MBE (1927 – 22 December 2011) was a British police officer and former Superintendent Durham Constabulary. Harrison attended the University of Durham and gained an LLB in Law. He was President of the Durham Union for Easter term of 1952, and Editor of Palatinate in Easter and Michaelmas 1950. During his retirement, Harrison founded The Peeler (magazine).
