= Palatinate (newspaper) =

Durham University student newspaper

Coordinates: 54°46′24″N 1°34′18″W

- Scribere historiam Dunelmensis
- Front page from 5 December 2013
- Type: Fortnightly newspaper
- Format: Tabloid
- Publisher: Durham Students' Union
- Editor-in-chief: Hugh Ludford and Finn Watton
- Founded: 17 March 1948; 78 years ago
- Headquarters: Dunelm House, Durham
- Website: palatinate.org.uk

Palatinate is the student newspaper of Durham University. One of Britain's oldest student publications, Palatinate is frequently ranked as one of the leading student outlets in the UK and Ireland, winning Best Publication in the Student Publication Association's 2018 and 2021 national awards. The name of the newspaper derives from the colour palatinate, a shade of purple closely associated with the university and derived from County Durham's political history as a County Palatine. It published its first edition on 17 March 1948.

Palatinate is published on a fortnightly basis during term time, and its editors-in-chief are elected by the editorial board. The paper emphasises news and investigations about Durham University, and also includes sports, science, comment, satire, and a pull-out arts and lifestyle magazine, Indigo. Durham Students’ Union previously paid for the publication of Palatinate, but the organisation now relies mostly on advertising and alumni donations to fund printing of the print edition.

== History ==
The first issue of the student newspaper was published on 17 March 1948. Although the paper was initially designed to "bridge the gap" between the Newcastle and Durham divisions of the university poor sales in the Newcastle college led to the paper refocussing as a Durham-only publication after just three issues. Several of the Newcastle students involved in establishing Palatinate went on to set up their own paper for Newcastle students, King's Courier.

From 2001 until 2004, Palatinate was published in broadsheet format, before reverting to tabloid format.

In November 2008, Palatinate launched Indigo, an arts and features pull-out supplement, and celebrated its 700th edition.

In May 2011, Palatinate revealed that the university had accepted donations from British American Tobacco, leading to coverage in the national press. The university faced scrutiny in December 2011 when Palatinate reported on disquiet over the appointment of David Held as master of University College. This led to the head of the students' union informing the editor that the Vice-Chancellor wanted a printed apology, for the university to see every edition before it went to press, and for the editor (who had also broken the British American Tobacco story) to resign. These requests were not accepted, however the paper was forced to publish a counter-article written by a senior member of the university administration.

In March 2013, a Science and Technology section was launched online and printed in the bumper 750th Celebratory Edition. In 2014, Palatinate launched a Profile section. Since December 2014, journalists from the newspaper have interviewed people such as Jess Phillips, Steph Houghton, David Blunkett, Edwina Currie, Moazzam Begg, Owen Jones, Esther Rantzen and Norman Baker.

In November 2015, issues began to be digitised on the Palatinate website. In 2017, the newspaper celebrated its 800th edition, with guest columns by former editors Sir Harold Evans, Hunter Davies and Jeremy Vine, along with an interview with George Alagiah. Palatinate celebrated its 70th anniversary in 2018.

In September 2020, citing the impact of COVID-19, Durham Students' Union cut its funding for Palatinate's print edition. Editors-in-Chief Imogen Usherwood and Tash Mosheim launched a fundraising appeal which provided the means to fund print for Michaelmas term in full and Epiphany in part. In November 2020, Palatinate's website was redesigned for the first time since its creation.

In March 2021, Palatinate announced the relaunch of PalatinateTV (or PalTV), which it described as "Durham's first student TV station". The trailer on YouTube featured former Palatinate Editor-in-Chief Jeremy Vine.

In May 2021, Palatinate was declared the best student publication in the UK at the Student Publication Association Awards. The paper also took home Best Reporter (Toby Donegan-Cross) and Best News Story, and was highly commended for the Billy Dowling-Reid Award for Outstanding Commitment (Imogen Usherwood and Tash Mosheim), Best Sports Coverage and Best Science Section. The paper had been nominated for 13 awards, including Best Website and Best Digital Media. In December of that year, the paper's coverage of a walkout at a South College formal dinner in protest at a speech by controversial columnist Rod Liddle was cited by the Guardian.

In November 2022, Palatinate's editorial board voted 97% in favour of becoming an independent newspaper, and leaving Durham Students' Union. As of January 2024, Palatinate has not left the Durham Students' Union.

== Structure ==
Palatinate is published by, but is editorially independent from, Durham Students’ Union. The newspaper has an editorial board of around 80 student volunteers, and its video side, Palatinate TV, has a separate team of a similar size. Students apply to volunteer for Palatinate, which does not charge membership fees. Both the newspaper and TV side train students for free in journalistic skills, including media law, video editing, camera operating, lighting and sound, and newspaper design software.

Many students every year leave Palatinate to work directly for media organisations or pursue postgraduate qualifications in journalism. There are two Editors-in-Chief of Palatinate, elected by the editorial board for two terms each, following a recommendation by a board of directors. All other roles in the newspaper and video side are appointed by the Editors-in-Chief after a competitive application process. The design of the newspaper has changed subtly over the years, including the introduction of a crest, and several redesigns of the arts and lifestyle magazine.

== Awards ==
- In 2025, Palatinate was recognised as the Best Publication in the North of England by the Student Publication Association. Elliot Burrin (Editor-in-Chief Epiphany and Easter 2024) was highly commended for the Best Journalist award. Lily Gershon (Editor-in-Chief Michaelmas 2024 and Epiphany 2025) was highly commended for her Outstanding Achievement.
- In 2021, Palatinate received national commendation in the Houses of Parliament for "providing a high standard of journalism and a pathway for a career in the media for students at Durham University."
- In 2001, Palatinate was named the NUS/The Independent Student Newspaper of the Year. In 2003, reporter Oliver Brown was runner-up for the Best Student Reporter category of the NUS National Student Media Awards.
- In 1999, Palatinate was named runner-up in the Student Newspaper of the Year category of the Guardian Student Media Awards.

== PalTV ==
PalTV
- Type: Student television station
- Location: Durham, England
- Station Manager: Horatio Wong
- Website: paltv.co.uk
- YouTube: @PalTVUK
- Instagram: @PalTVUK
- TikTok: @PalTVUK

The first launch of Palatinate TV occurred in 2009, when the Palatinate YouTube channel was first created. After a few dormant years, including another attempted reboot 2014, it was rebooted successfully in 2021 as PalTV by James Tillotson (now a senior journalist at BBC News). Amongst the early content produced were interviews with candidates for the upcoming Student Union elections. PalTV has maintained content production since with a blend of on demand and live content generated by students in Durham and around the world as part of the stations 'foreign correspondent program' PalTV Global. PalTV Global is formed of students studying abroad who file content and work with students in Durham to create foreign reporting.

PalTV runs a mentorship scheme for students looking to get involved in broadcast journalism.

In 2021, PalTV was nominated for the Bright Network Impact on Campus Award for "going above and beyond to support their members and the wider university to achieve success, in terms of careers and development of new skills and personal growth."

PalTV was awarded Broadcaster of the Year in 2022 at the National Student Television Association (NaSTA) awards. Dylan Rana became the new station manager in 2023. It retained the Broadcaster of the Year title in 2023, alongside winning gold awards in the News and Current Affairs, the Tim Marshall Award for Special Recognition, and the Technical Innovation categories. It won Broadcaster of the Year for a third successive year in 2024, alongside winning gold awards in the News and Current Affairs, the Post Production, and the Title Sequence categories.

A documentary on the ongoing student housing crisis in Durham became PalTV's most-viewed video on its YouTube channel, the station's primary platform, amassing over 30,000 views as of 22 February 2024.

== Notable editors-in-chief ==
- Christopher Lamb, 2005 – Vatican correspondent for CNN
- Jonah Fisher, 1999 – climate correspondent for BBC News
- Jane Marriot, 1997 – British High Commissioner to Kenya
- Dan Rivers, 1994 – correspondent at ITV News
- Cristina Nicolotti Squires, 1987 – Director of Content at Sky News
- Jeremy Vine, 1986 – BBC Radio 2 Host and journalist
- George Alagiah, 1976 – newsreader and journalist
- Timothy Laurence, 1975 – Navy Admiral
- Piers Merchant, 1971 – British Conservative MP
- Mark Featherstone-Witty, 1971 – co-founder of the Liverpool Institute of Performing Arts
- Richard Ayre, 1969 – former Chief Executive at BBC News
- John Kay, 1963 – journalist for The Sun
- John Exelby, 1962 – co-founder of BBC World Service
- William Quantrill, 1960 – former ambassador to Cameroon
- Hunter Davies, 1957 – biographer
- D. A. Reeder, 1951 – British historian
- H. M. Evans, 1951 – editor for The Sunday Times
- Derek Harrison, 1950 – former superintendent at Durham Constabulary
- E. K. T. Coles, 1949 – specialist in adult literacy
- J. E. H. Spaul, 1948 – British ancient historian
