= Optical ground wire =

Cable that combines grounding and communications

An optical ground wire (also known as an OPGW or, in the IEEE standard, an optical fiber composite overhead ground wire) is a type of cable that is used in overhead power lines. Such a cable combines the functions of grounding and telecommunications. An OPGW cable contains a tubular structure with one or more optical fibers in it, surrounded by layers of steel and aluminum wire. The OPGW cable is run between the tops of high-voltage electricity pylons. The conductive part of the cable serves to bond adjacent towers to earth ground, and shields the high-voltage conductors from lightning strikes. The optical fibers within the cable can be used for high-speed transmission of data, either for the electrical utility's own purposes of protection and control of the transmission line, for the utility's own voice and data communication, or may be leased or sold to third parties to serve as a high-speed fiber interconnection between cities.

The optical fiber itself is an insulator and is immune to power transmission line and lightning induction, external electrical noise and crosstalk, although lightning strikes can induce tracking issues with coherent optical systems due to state of polarization (SOP) speedup events. Typically, OPGW cables contain single-mode optical fibers with low transmission loss, allowing long-distance transmission at high speeds. The outer appearance of OPGW is similar to aluminium-conductor steel-reinforced cable (ACSR), usually used for shield wires.

== History ==
An OPGW cable was patented by BICC in 1977, and installation of optical ground wires became widespread starting in the 1980s. In the peak year of 2000, around 60,000 km of OPGW was installed worldwide. Asia, especially China, has become the largest regional market for OPGW used in transmission-line construction.

== Construction ==
Several different styles of OPGW are made. In one type, between 8 and 48 glass optical fibers are placed in a plastic tube. The tube is inserted into a stainless steel, aluminum, or aluminum-coated steel tube, with some slack length of fiber allowed to prevent strain on the glass fibers. The buffer tubes are filled with grease to protect the fiber unit from water and to protect the steel tube from corrosion; the interstices of the cable are filled with grease. The tube is stranded into the cable with aluminum, aluminum alloy or steel strands, similar to an ACSR cable. The steel strands provide strength, and the aluminum strands provide electrical conductivity. For very large fiber counts, up to 144 fibers in one cable, multiple tubes are used.

In other types, an aluminum rod has several spiral grooves around the outside, in which fibers in buffer tubes are laid. The fiber unit is covered with a plastic or steel tape, and the whole is surrounded with aluminum and steel strands.

Individual fibers may be in "loose buffer" tubes, where the inside diameter of the tube is greater than the fiber outside diameter, or may be "tight buffered" where the plastic buffer is coated directly onto the glass. Fibers for OPGW are single-mode type.

== Comparison with other methods ==
Optical fibers are used by utilities as an alternative to private point-to-point microwave systems, power line carrier or communication circuits on metallic cables.

OPGW as a communication medium has some advantages over buried optical fiber cable. Installation cost per kilometre is lower than that of a buried cable. Effectively, the optical circuits are protected from accidental contact by the high-voltage cables below (and by the elevation of the OPGW from ground). A communications circuit carried by an overhead OPGW cable is unlikely to be damaged by excavation work, road repairs or installation of buried pipelines. Since the overall dimensions and weight of an OPGW are similar to those of regular grounding wire, the towers supporting the line do not experience extra loading due to cable weight, wind and ice loads.

An alternative to OPGW is use of the power cables to support a separately installed fiber bundle. Other alternatives include fiber-bearing composite power conductors (OPCC), wrapped fibre optic cable (SkyWrap or OPAC), or using transmission towers to support a separate All-Dielectric Self-Supporting fiber cable with no conductive elements.

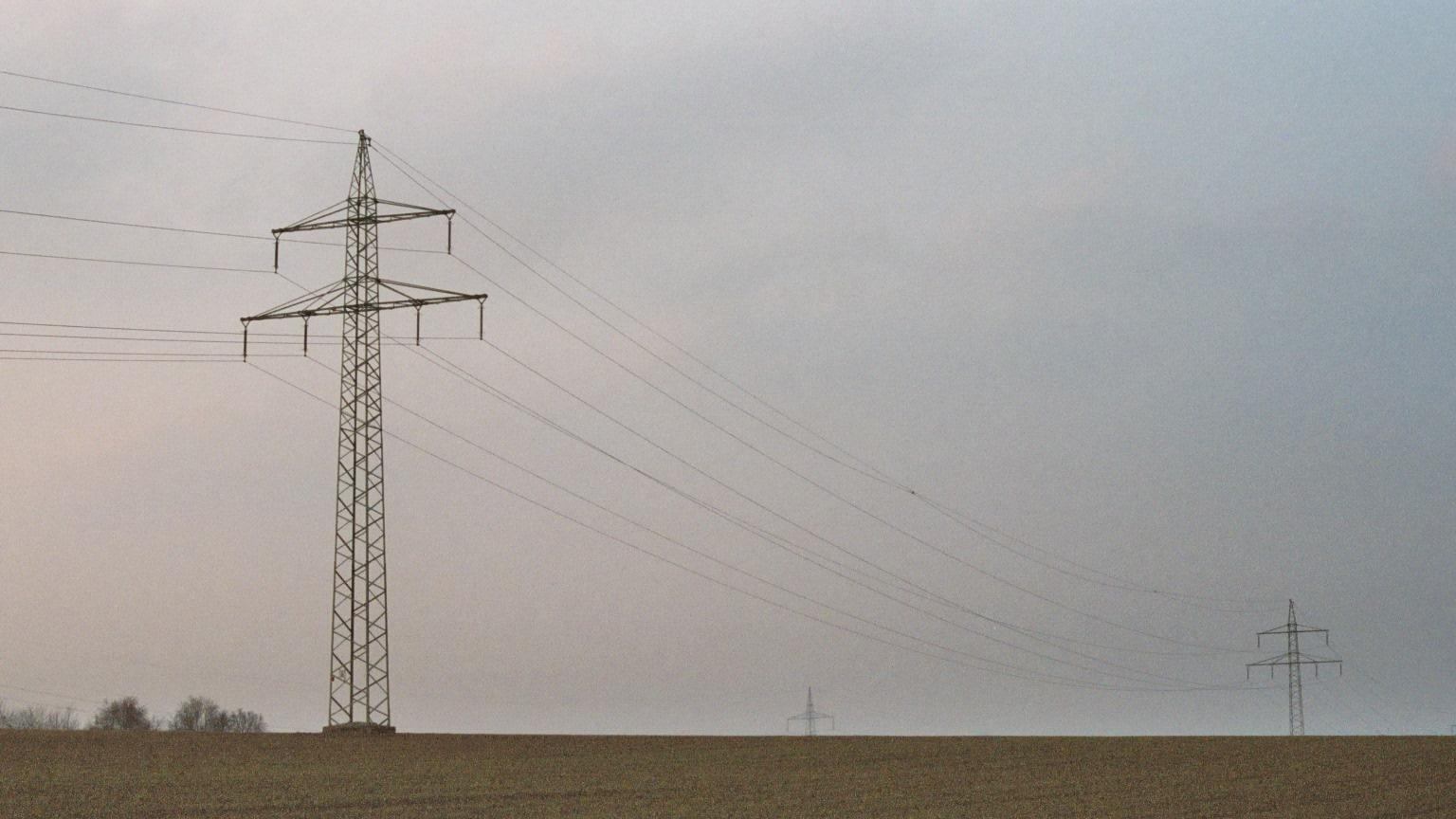
Air cable spun like a garland on a 110 kV powerline of EnBW AG near Leonberg in Germany

== Application ==
A utility may install many more fibers than it needs for its internal communications, both to allow for future needs and also to lease or sell to telecommunications companies. Rental fees for these "dark fibers" (spares) can provide a valuable source of revenue for the electrical utility. However, when rights-of-way for a transmission line have been expropriated from landowners, utilities have occasionally been restricted from such leasing agreements on the basis that the original right of way was only granted for electric power transmission.

OPGW can be used for distributed temperature sensing, helping identify potential trouble spots along power lines. This is valuable for detecting and locating faults, such as hotspots or damaged sections, before they lead to more significant issues. The optical fibers within OPGW enable utilities to monitor the health and performance of power lines. This real-time data can be crucial for early detection of faults or potential issues, allowing for quicker response times and preventive maintenance.

OPGW facilitates the implementation of smart grid technologies by providing a communication backbone. It allows for the exchange of data between various components of the power grid, enabling better monitoring and control for improved efficiency and reliability.

Lower-voltage distribution lines may also carry OPGW wires for bonding and communications; however, utilities may also install all-dielectric self-supporting (ADSS) cables on distribution pole lines. These cables are somewhat similar to those used for telephone and cable television distribution.

While OPGW is easily installed in new construction, electrical utilities find the increased capacity of fiber to be so useful that techniques have been developed for the replacement of ground wires with OPGW on energized lines. Live-line working techniques are used to re-strand the towers with OPGW, replacing the all-metal type of overhead shield wires.

== Installation ==
Installation of OPGW requires some additional planning because it is impractical to splice an OPGW cable in mid-span; the lengths of cable purchased must be coordinated with the spans between towers to prevent waste. Where fibers must be joined between lengths, a weatherproof splice box is installed on a tower; a similar box is used to transition from the OPGW to an outside plant fiber-only cable to connect the fibers to terminal equipment.
