= Kawauchi, Fukushima =

Kawauchi 川内村
- Village
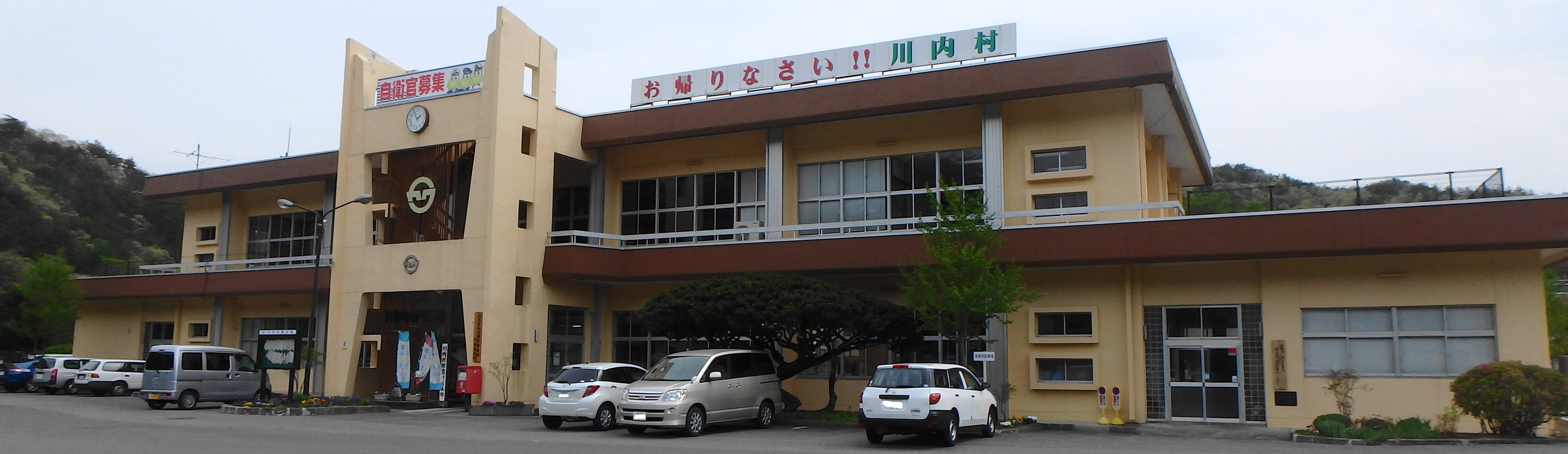

- Flag Seal

- Location of Kawauchi in Fukushima Prefecture

- Coordinates: 37°20′15″N 140°48′34″E
- Country: Japan
- Region: Tōhoku
- Prefecture: Fukushima
- District: Futaba

Area
  - Total: 197.35 km^{2} (76.20 sq mi)

Population (January 1, 2020)
  - Total: 1,861
  - Density: 9.430/km^{2} (24.42/sq mi)
- Time zone: UTC+9 (Japan Standard Time)
- Phone number: 0240-38-2111
- Address: Kamikawauchi, Kawauchi-mura, Futaba-gun, Fukushima-ken 979-1292
- Climate: Cfa
- Website: Official website
- Symbols
- Bird: Japanese bush-warbler
- Flower: Enkianthus campanulatus
- Tree: Abies firma

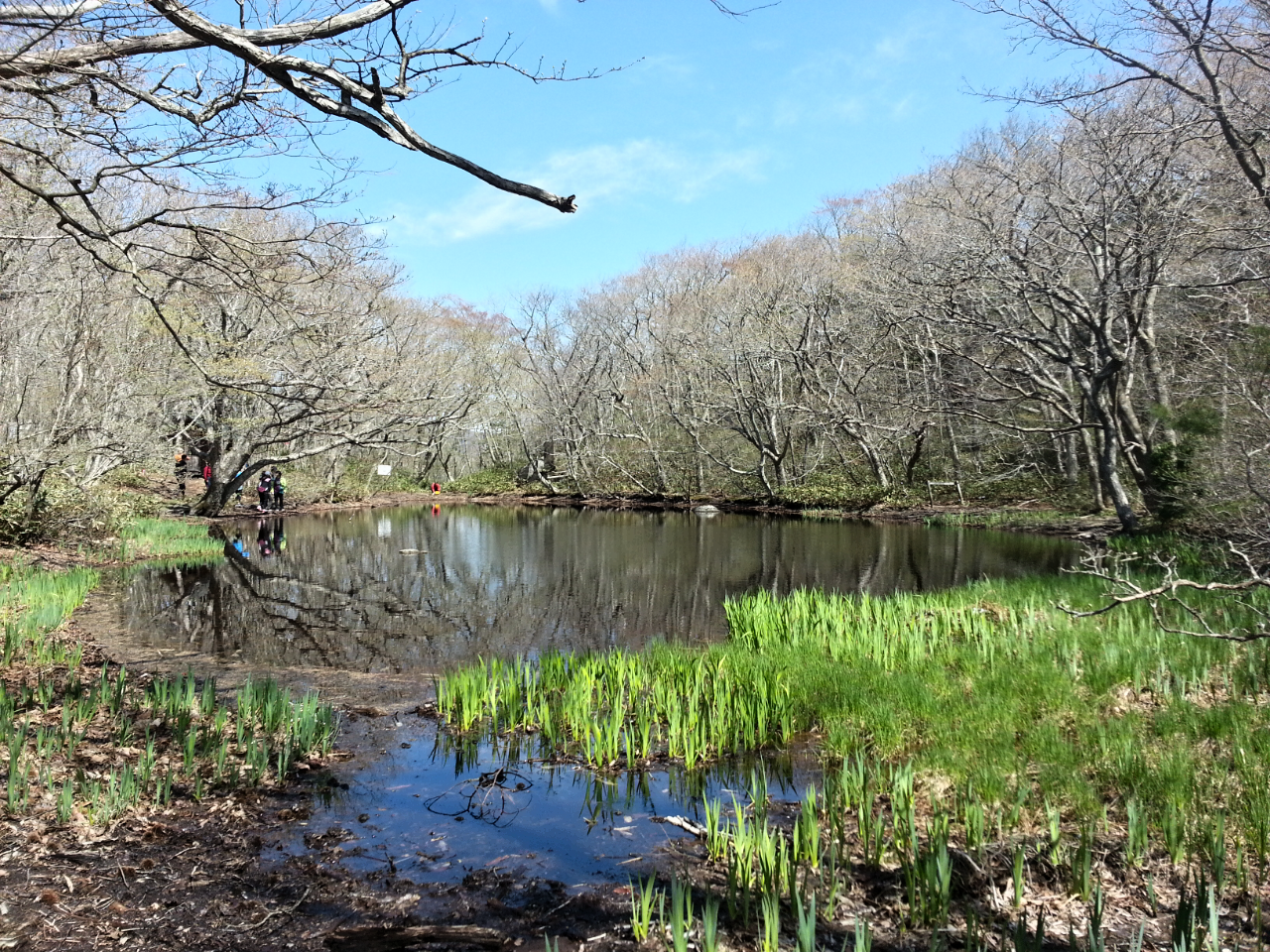
Hebusu Swamp in Kawauchi

Kawauchi (川内村, Kawauchi-mura) is a village located in Fukushima Prefecture, Japan. As of 1 January 2020, the village had an official registered population of 1,861, and a population density of 9.5 persons per km². The total area of Kawauchi is 197.35 square kilometres (76.20 sq mi). The village was evacuated as a result of the 2011 Fukushima Daiichi nuclear disaster, but in 2014, all restrictions were lifted. It is located in Futaba district

== Geography ==
Kawauchi is located in the Abukuma Plateau of central Fukushima with a mean altitude of between 400 and 500 meters. North of Kawauchi, there is at 37°22′53″N 140°48′16″E a substation of Kita–Iwaki powerline, a 500 kV-line already designed for future 1100 kV operation.

=== Surrounding municipalities ===
- Fukushima Prefecture
  - Iwaki
  - Naraha
  - Ōkuma
  - Tamura
  - Tomioka

=== Climate ===
Kawauchi has a humid continental climate (Köppen Cfa) characterized by mild summers and cold winters with heavy snowfall. The average annual temperature in Kawauchi is 10.3 °C. The average annual rainfall is 1431 mm with September as the wettest month. The temperatures are highest on average in August, at around 22.5 °C, and lowest in January, at around -0.7 °C.

Climate data for Kawauchi (1991−2020 normals, extremes 1976−present)
Month	Jan	Feb	Mar	Apr	May	Jun	Jul	Aug	Sep	Oct	Nov	Dec	Year
Record high °C (°F)	15.7 (60.3)	20.1 (68.2)	23.0 (73.4)	29.7 (85.5)	32.2 (90.0)	34.1 (93.4)	35.7 (96.3)	36.5 (97.7)	33.6 (92.5)	28.2 (82.8)	24.1 (75.4)	20.3 (68.5)	36.5 (97.7)
Mean daily maximum °C (°F)	4.3 (39.7)	5.2 (41.4)	9.1 (48.4)	15.2 (59.4)	20.4 (68.7)	23.1 (73.6)	26.9 (80.4)	27.9 (82.2)	23.7 (74.7)	18.2 (64.8)	13.1 (55.6)	7.3 (45.1)	16.2 (61.2)
Daily mean °C (°F)	−0.5 (31.1)	0.0 (32.0)	3.3 (37.9)	8.8 (47.8)	14.0 (57.2)	17.7 (63.9)	21.7 (71.1)	22.5 (72.5)	18.6 (65.5)	12.6 (54.7)	6.9 (44.4)	2.1 (35.8)	10.6 (51.2)
Mean daily minimum °C (°F)	−5.3 (22.5)	−5.1 (22.8)	−2.1 (28.2)	2.4 (36.3)	7.8 (46.0)	12.9 (55.2)	17.5 (63.5)	18.4 (65.1)	14.2 (57.6)	7.6 (45.7)	1.2 (34.2)	−2.7 (27.1)	5.6 (42.0)
Record low °C (°F)	−17.7 (0.1)	−18.4 (−1.1)	−17.0 (1.4)	−11.5 (11.3)	−3.1 (26.4)	1.4 (34.5)	6.2 (43.2)	6.2 (43.2)	1.0 (33.8)	−4.7 (23.5)	−9.2 (15.4)	−18.0 (−0.4)	−18.4 (−1.1)
Average precipitation mm (inches)	62.3 (2.45)	47.4 (1.87)	95.1 (3.74)	122.4 (4.82)	111.3 (4.38)	141.2 (5.56)	181.2 (7.13)	171.8 (6.76)	234.1 (9.22)	181.0 (7.13)	70.2 (2.76)	48.3 (1.90)	1,484.1 (58.43)
Average precipitation days (≥ 1.0 mm)	5.9	5.9	9.1	9.5	10.4	12.3	13.8	11.2	12.1	9.9	7.0	6.3	113.4
Mean monthly sunshine hours	170.7	169.0	186.9	194.3	203.6	148.5	144.0	159.6	122.2	132.0	149.2	161.6	1,943.4
Source: Japan Meteorological Agency

== Demographics ==
Per Japanese census data, the population of Kawauchi has declined steadily over the past 60 years and is now less than half what it was a century ago.

Historical population
Year	Pop.	±%
1920	5,573	—
1930	4,275	−23.3%
1940	4,540	+6.2%
1950	5,930	+30.6%
1960	5,966	+0.6%
1970	4,709	−21.1%
1980	4,132	−12.3%
1990	3,933	−4.8%
2000	3,384	−14.0%
2010	2,821	−16.6%
2020	2,044	−27.5%

== History ==
The area of present-day Kawauchi was part of Mutsu Province. After the Meiji restoration, on April 1, 1889, the village of Kawauchi was created within Futaba District, Fukushima with the establishment of the modern municipalities system.

=== 2011 Fukushima Daiichi nuclear disaster ===
Kawauchi suffered moderate damage from the 2011 Tōhoku earthquake and tsunami. However, the eastern portion of the village is located within the nominal 20-kilometer exclusion zone of the Fukushima Daiichi nuclear power plant, and as a result of wind patterns following the Fukushima Daiichi nuclear disaster, the entire population of the village was evacuated by government order by May 2011. A portion of the village was re-opened in March 2012.

In August 2014, the government divided the remaining portion of the village into two zones, and projected a lifting of the evacuation order for 275 residents in one of the zones in October.

The ambient radiation dose was lower than that of the surrounding municipalities, and as of 2012, the average exposure dose among residents was reported to be below 1 millisievert per year. By 2017, more than 80% of the villagers had returned, but many were older and the younger generation had a lower return rate than the whole. It was reported that lifestyle-related diseases after the earthquake were increasing with the aging of the population. More than 100 Bq/kg of radioactive cesium has been detected in 76% of wild mushrooms collected between 2016 and 2019.

== Economy ==
The economy of Kawauchi was formerly heavily dependent on agriculture.

== Education ==
Kawauchi had two high schools (one public, one private), one junior high school, two elementary schools, and a kindergarten in March 2011. After the evacuation and re-opening of the town both high schools were closed. The junior high school, 1 elementary school, and kindergarten remain open.

== Transportation ==
=== Railway ===
- Kawauchi is not served by any train stations.

=== Bus ===
- Kawauchi is served by bus, taking you both east and west.

=== Highway ===
- National Route 399
