= Overhead wire marker =

Markers identifying overhead lines to aircraft

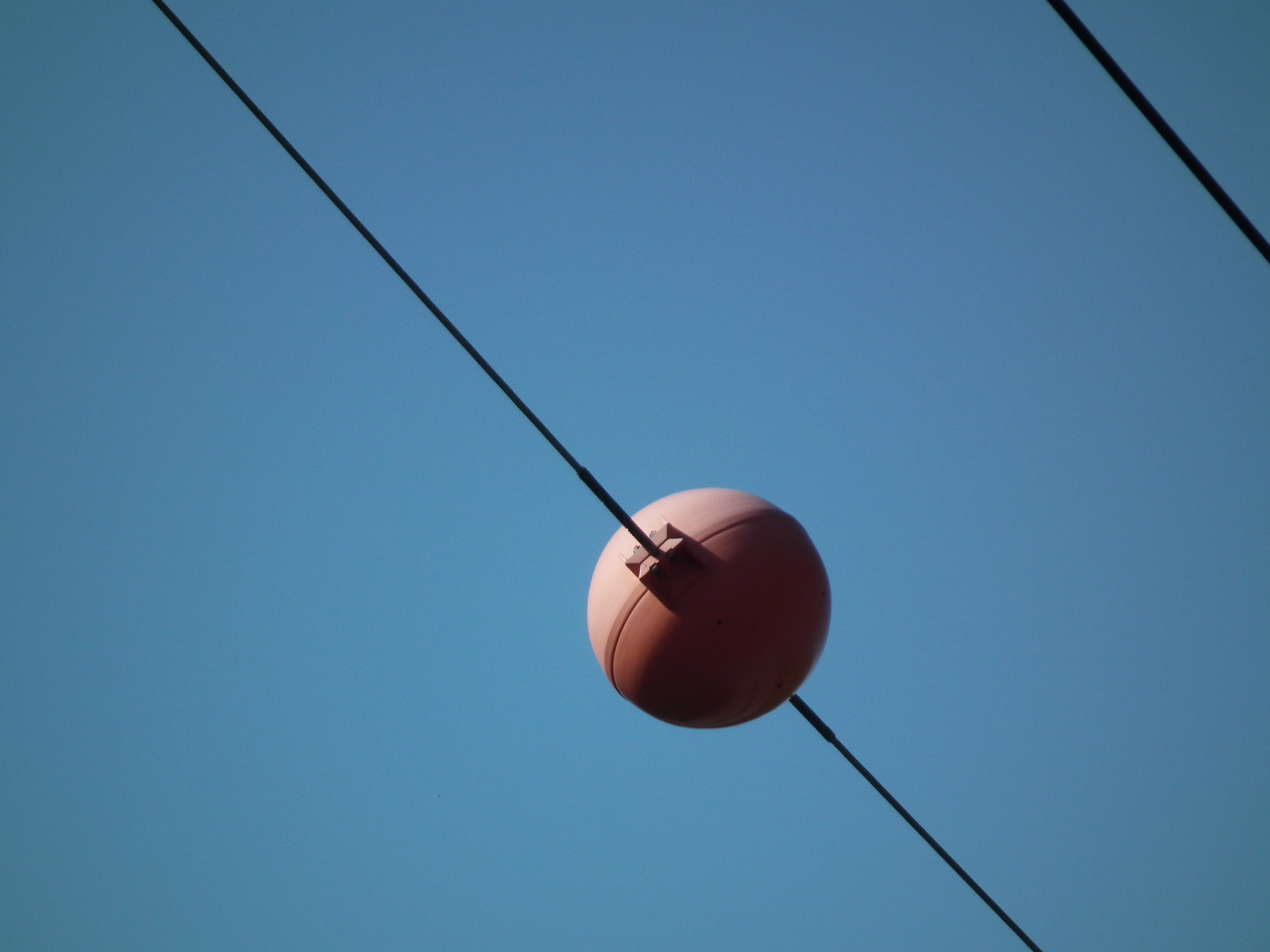
A spherical marker. Spherical markers are also known as aerial marker balls.

Overhead wire markers are safety instruments applied to the overhead power lines marking transmission lines and ropeways along the flight path during the day.

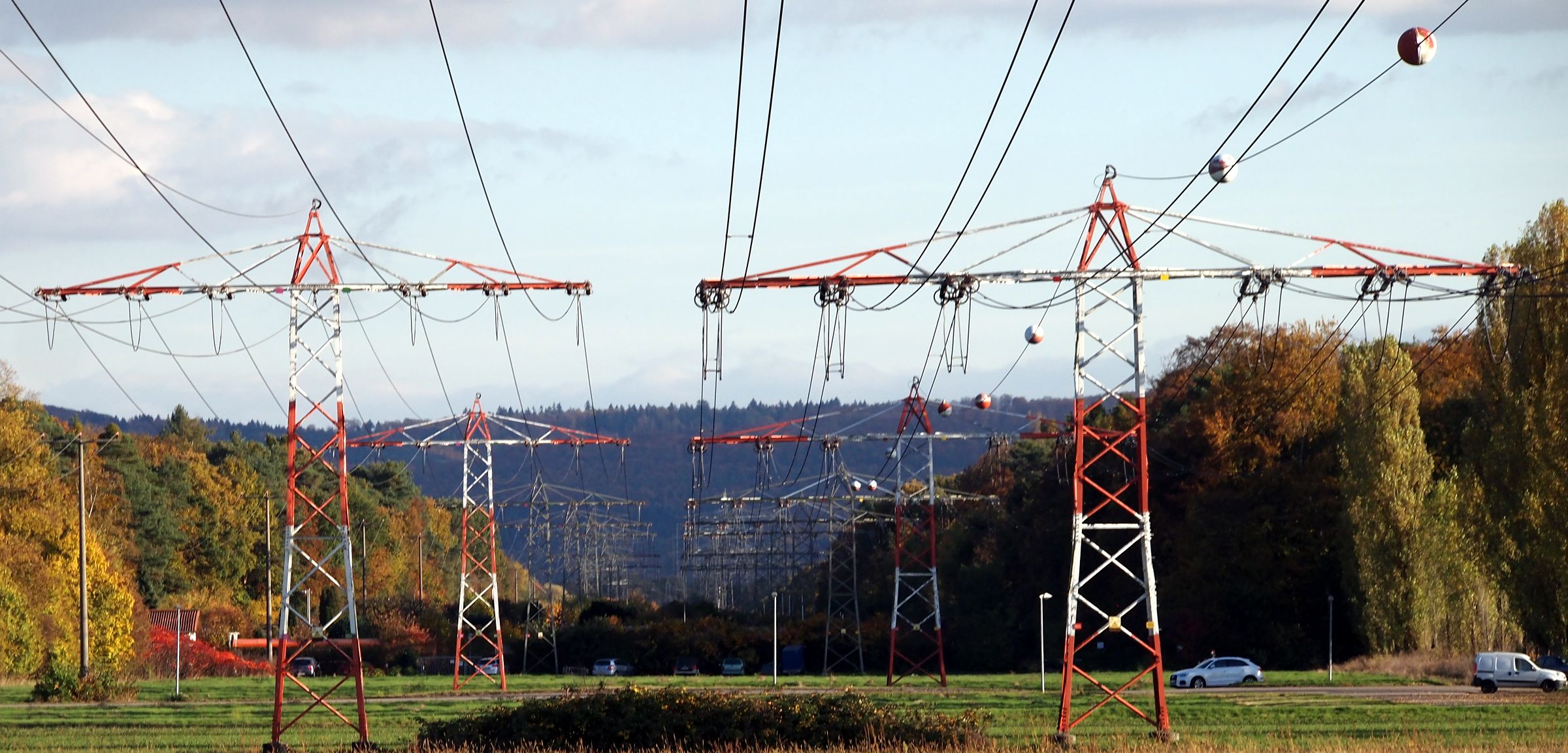
Markers on a line near an airfield

Markers are often installed on overhead lines near airfields, or at river crossings where there is a possibility of seaplanes using the river. Some markers contain conductor marking lights or strobe lights to improve visibility at night or in fog.

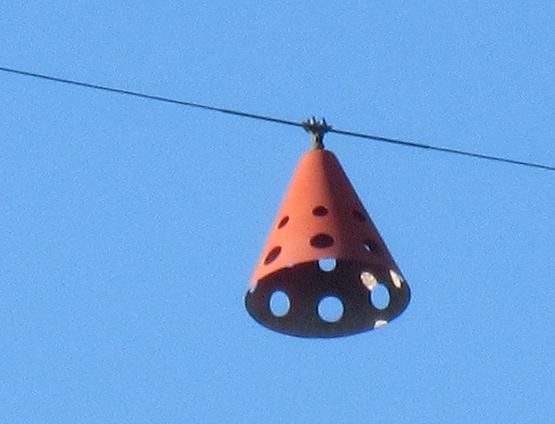
A conical overhead wire marker near an airstrip

== See also ==
- Balisor
