= Balisor =

Type of power line warning beacon

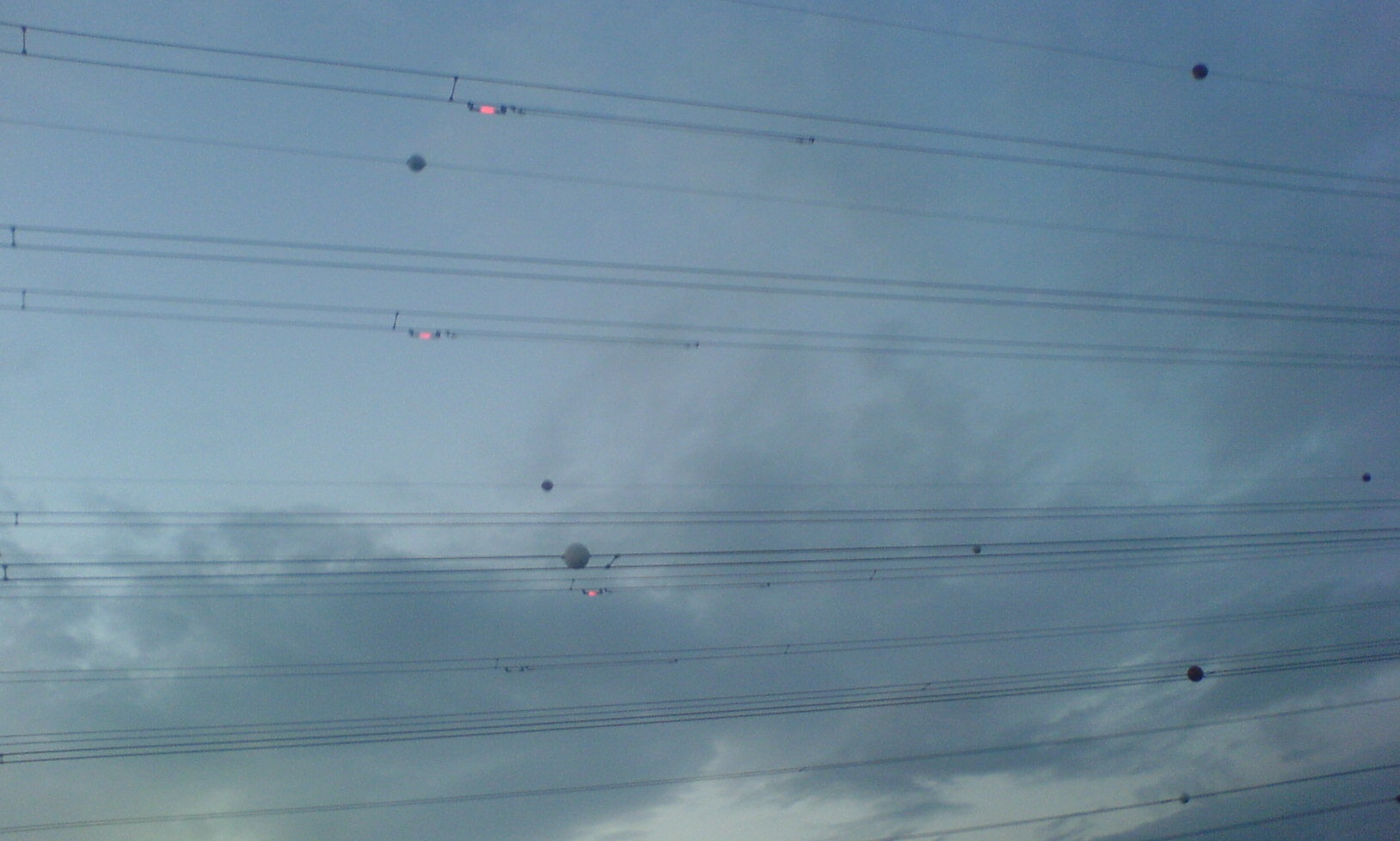
Photograph showing Balisor beacons in use on high voltage cables

Balisor is a system of illuminated beacons for high voltage power lines using a cold-cathode low-pressure neon lamp, used as an aircraft warning light.

== Description ==
High voltage power cables, particularly those close to airports, need to be visible day and night. During the day, brightly coloured balls positioned along the length of the cables are sufficient, but during the night, lighting is necessary. These beacons provide this lighting by glowing red, the standard colour used in aviation for warning beacons.

The system is extremely simple, efficient and reliable and is considered the most economically viable solution. Its working principle is attractive, because it uses a phenomenon usually considered as a weakness. However a large disadvantage is that it does not work when the line is switched off. It cannot also be used on HVDC powerlines, but similar devices may be also used on mast radiators.

== Operating principle ==
The interest of the system lies in the way it obtains a power supply directly from the single cable on which it is mounted. It is difficult to obtain a very small amount of energy from a line which transports an enormous amount.

System diagram

Each high voltage cable creates an electric field around itself, in the same way as any live electrical conductor. When the electric potential of such a cable is sufficiently high, its electric field causes a significant voltage difference between the cable and its immediate neighbour. (It is the strength of the electric field that makes it difficult to use low powers.)

As a result, a second conductor a few metres long, insulated from but parallel to the high voltage cable, will have a potential different from that of the main cable. Together the conductors make a capacitor charged across an air gap (dielectric).

Under certain conditions, the accumulated charge (and hence the potential difference) is sufficient to trigger a discharge lamp. This what is used in practice, giving a reliable and robust beacon.

== See also ==
- Aviation obstruction lighting
- Overhead wire marker
- Rogowski coil, a device that gets energy from the magnetic field, instead of the electric field
