= Kita-Iwaki powerline =

Kita-Iwaki Powerline

Location
- Country: Japan
- Coordinates: 35°35′26″N 138°47′59″E; 36°34′33″N 139°13′25″E; 37°25′33″N 138°35′51″E; 37°22′53″N 140°48′16″E; 36°37′22″N 138°48′6″E; 36°42′46″N 139°49′57″E
- From: Minami-Iwaki switch
- To: Higashi-Yamanashi substation

Ownership information
- Operator: Tokyo Electric Power Corporation

Construction information
- Commissioned: 1999

Technical information
- Total length: 240 km (150 mi)
- AC voltage: 500 kV
- No. of circuits: 2

The Kita-Iwaki Powerline is the largest double-circuit powerline for three-phase electric power in the world. Built in 1999, it runs from the Minami-Iwaki switch (Tamura, Fukushima) to the Higashi-Yamanashi substation (Ōtsuki, Yamanashi) and has 2 circuits, which are presently operated at 500 kV, but can be switched over to 1100 kV if necessary equipment is installed. The conductors of the lines consist of 8*31.5 mm ACSR ropes providing for a total current capacity of 4000 amperes. The line is supported by lattice towers with a typical height of 108 meters. These have three crossbars of spanning 31, 32 and 33 meters.

There are two such lines: the first one is 190 kilometers long and starts at the Kashiwazaki-Kariwa Nuclear Power Plant and runs over the Nishi-Gunma switch to the Higashi-Yamanashi substation. It was built in 1993. The second 240 kilometers long line, which was built in 1999 starts at the Nishi-Gunma substation and runs over the Higashi-Gunma substation to the Minami-Iwaki switch, whereby it passes close to the Shin-Imaichi switch, which is not connected to the line.

== Sites ==
Substation/switch	Coordinates
Higashi-Yamanashi	35°35′26″N 138°47′59″E
Higashi-Gunma	36°34′33″N 139°13′25″E
Kashiwazaki-Kariwa	37°25′33″N 138°35′51″E
Minami-Iwaki	37°22′53″N 140°48′16″E
Nishi-Gunma	36°37′22″N 138°48′6″E
Shin-Imaichi	36°42′46″N 139°49′57″E

== Sources ==
- http://old.life-needs-power.de/2008/24-04-2008_Donnerstag/24042008_16-30_LNP_Luxa_1100%20kV-V2%203.pdf#page=9
