= Al-Ca composite =

Al-Ca composite is a high-conductivity, high-strength, lightweight composite consisting of sub-micron-diameter pure calcium metal filaments embedded inside a pure aluminium metal matrix. The material is still in the development phase, but it has potential use as an overhead high-voltage power transmission conductor. It could also be used wherever an exceptionally light, high-strength conductor is needed. Its physical properties make it especially well-suited for DC transmission. Compared with conventional conductors such as aluminium-conductor steel-reinforced cable (ACSR), all aluminium alloy conductors (AAAC), aluminium conductor alloy reinforced (ACAR), aluminium conductor composite reinforced ACCR and ACCC conductor that conduct alternating current well and DC current somewhat less well (due to the skin effect), Al-Ca conductor is essentially a single uniform material with high DC conductivity, allowing the core strands and the outer strands of a conductor cable to all be the same wire type. This conductor is inherently strong so that there is no need for a strong (usually poorly conductive) core to support its own weight as is done in conventional conductors. This eliminates the "bird caging", spooling, and thermal fatigue problems caused by thermal expansion coefficient mismatch between the core and outer strands. The Al-Ca phase interfaces strengthen the composite substantially, but do not have a noticeable effect on restricting the mean free path of electrons, which gives the composite both high strength and high conductivity, a combination that is normally difficult to achieve with both pure metals and alloys. The high strength and light weight could reduce the number of towers needed per kilometer for long distance transmission lines. Since towers and their foundations often account for 50% of a powerline's construction cost, building fewer towers would save a substantial fraction of total construction costs. The high strength also could increase transmission reliability in wind/ice loading situations. The high conductivity has the potential to reduce Ohmic losses.

Al-Ca composite conductor was invented by Russell and Anderson at Ames Laboratory of the U.S. Department of Energy with the goal of developing the next generation power transmission cables. Al/Ca composite is produced by powder metallurgy and severe deformation processing (extrusion, swaging, wire drawing). This process would be roughly two to three times more expensive than conventional melt processing for ACSR. But the cost saving on tower construction is projected to be substantially larger than the extra cost of the conducting cables. During deformation processing, the Ca powder particles deform into filaments surrounded by the Al matrix, which avoids exposing calcium, a reactive element, to air and moisture. The corrosion resistance of this composite has been found to be similar to that of pure aluminium.

Al-Ca composite has good microstructural stability even above 300 °C. The formation of intermetallic compounds at the interface would stabilize the microstructure to avoid the degradation of its various properties during exposure to elevated temperatures, such as those encountered during emergency overload situations.

Newest development

An Al/Ca (20 vol%) nanofilamentary metal-metal composite was produced by powder metallurgy and severe plastic deformation. Fine Ca metal powders (~200 μm) were produced by centrifugal atomization, mixed with pure Al powder, and deformed by warm extrusion, swaging, and wire drawing to a true strain of 12.9. The Ca powder particles became fine Ca nanofilaments that reinforce the composite substantially by interface strengthening. The conductivity of the composite is slightly lower than the rule-of-mixtures prediction due to minor quantities of impurity inclusions. The elevated temperature performance of this composite was also evaluated by differential scanning calorimetry and resistivity measurements.

The ultimate tensile strength is as high as 480 MPa, twice as that of ACSR.

The electrical conductivity 33.02 (μΩ m)−1 is higher than most current commonly used conductors.
