= ACSS =

ACSS may refer to:

- Academy of Social Sciences, the UK's national academy of academics, learned societies and practitioners in the social sciences
- Afro Celt Sound System, a musical group which fuses modern dance rhythms with traditional Irish (Celtic) and West African music
- Aluminium-conductor steel supported electrical cable
- Antichrist Superstar, the second full-length studio album by Marilyn Manson
- Aural Cascading Style Sheets, part of Cascading Style Sheets that makes a website more accessible to visually impaired and screen readers
