= Aluminium-conductor steel-reinforced cable =

Type of overhead power line conductor

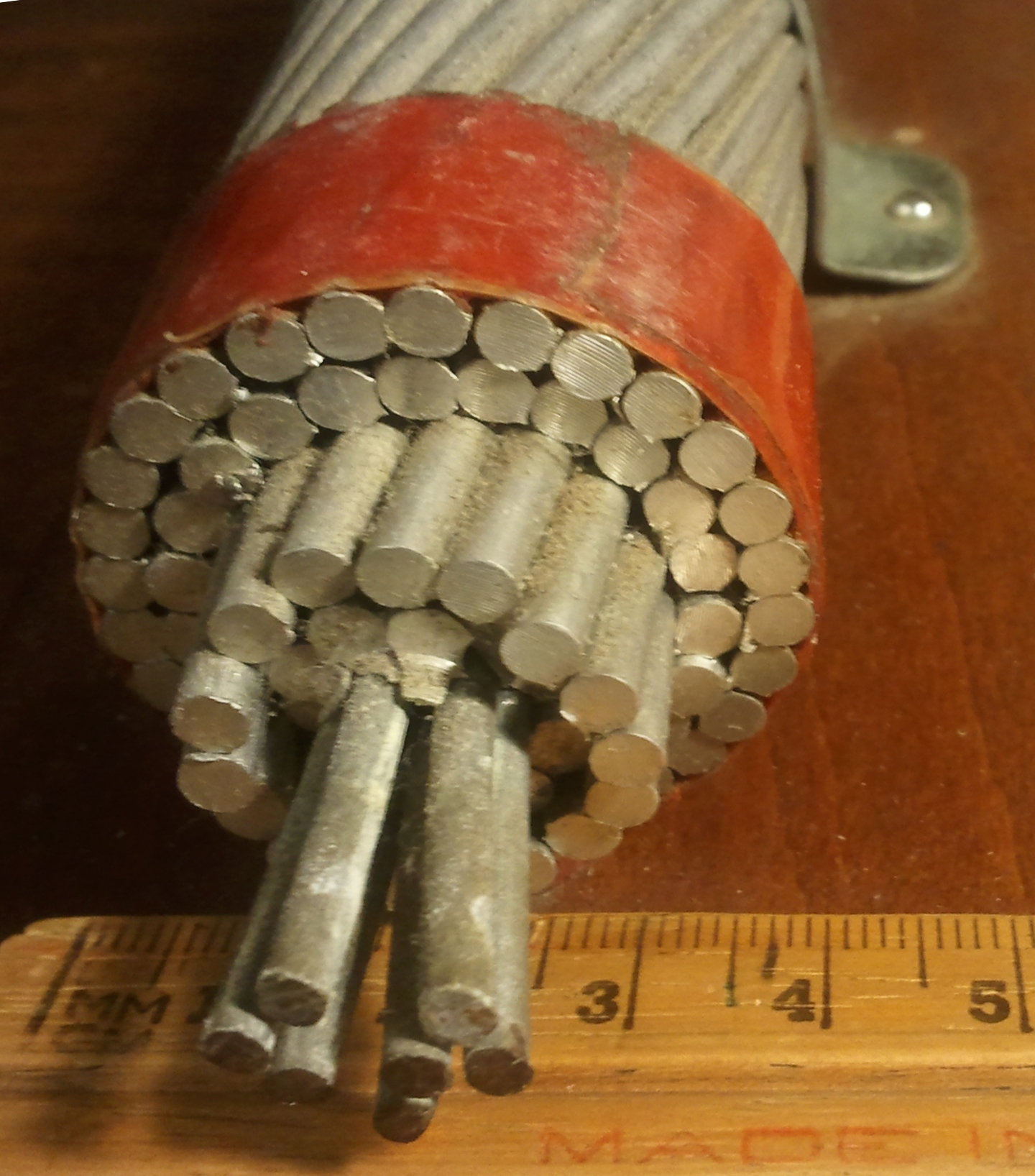
Sample cross-section of high tension power (pylon) line, showing 1 strand (7 wires) of steel surrounded by 4 concentric layers of aluminium.

Aluminum conductor steel-reinforced cable (ACSR) is a type of high-capacity, high-strength stranded conductor typically used in overhead power lines. The outer strands are high-purity aluminium, chosen for its good conductivity, low weight, low cost, resistance to corrosion and decent mechanical stress resistance. The centre strand is steel for additional strength to help support the weight of the conductor. Steel is of higher strength than aluminium which allows for increased mechanical tension to be applied on the conductor. Steel also has lower elastic and inelastic deformation (permanent elongation) due to mechanical loading (e.g. wind and ice) as well as a lower coefficient of thermal expansion under current loading. These properties allow ACSR to sag significantly less than all-aluminium conductors. As per the International Electrotechnical Commission (IEC) and The CSA Group (formerly the Canadian Standards Association or CSA) naming convention, ACSR is designated A1/S1A.

== Design ==
The aluminium alloy and temper used for the outer strands in the United States and Canada is normally 1350-H19 and elsewhere is 1370-H19, each with 99.5+% aluminium content. The temper of the aluminium is defined by the aluminium version's suffix, which in the case of H19 is extra hard. To extend the service life of the steel strands used for the conductor core they are normally galvanized, or coated with zinc to prevent corrosion. The diameters of the strands used for both the aluminum and steel strands vary for different ACSR conductors.

ACSR cable still depends on the tensile strength of the aluminium; it is only reinforced by the steel. Because of this, its continuous operating temperature is limited to 75 °C (167 °F), the temperature at which aluminium begins to anneal and soften over time. For situations where higher operating temperatures are required, aluminium-conductor steel-supported (ACSS) may be used.

=== Steel core ===
The standard steel core used for ACSR is galvanized steel, but zinc, 5% or 10% aluminium alloy and trace mischmetal coated steel (sometimes called by the trade-names Bezinal or Galfan) and aluminium-clad steel (sometimes called by the trade-name Alumoweld) are also available. Higher strength steel may also be used.

In the United States the most commonly used steel is designated GA2 for galvanized steel (G) with class A zinc coating thickness (A) and regular strength (2). Class C zinc coatings are thicker than class A and provide increased corrosion protection at the expense of reduced tensile strength. A regular strength galvanized steel core with Class C coating thickness would be designated GC2. Higher strength grades of steel are designated high-strength (3), extra-high-strength (4), and ultra-high-strength (5). An ultra-high-strength galvanized steel core with class A coating thickness would be designated GA5. The use of higher strength steel cores increases the tensile strength of the conductor allowing for higher tensions which results in lower sag.

Zinc-5% aluminium mischmetal coatings are designated with an "M". These coatings provide increased corrosion protection and heat resistance compared to zinc alone. Regular strength Class "A" mischmetal thickness weight coated regular strength steel would be designated MA2.

Aluminium-clad steel is designated as "AW". Aluminium-clad steel offers increased corrosion protection and conductivity at the expense of reduced tensile strength. Aluminium-clad steel is commonly specified for coastal applications.

IEC and CSA use a different naming convention. The most commonly used steel is S1A for S1 regular strength steel with a class A coating. S1 steel has slightly lower tensile strength than the regular strength steel used in the United States. Per the Canadian CSA standards the S2A strength grade is classified as High Strength steel. The equivalent material per the ASTM standards is the GA2 strength grade and called Regular Strength steel. The CSA S3A strength grade is classified as Extra High Strength steel. The equivalent material per the ASTM standards is the GA3 strength grade called High Strength. The present day CSA standards for overhead electrical conductor do not yet officially recognize the ASTM equivalent GA4 or GA5 grades. The present day CSA standards do not yet officially recognize the ASTM "M" family of zinc alloy coating material. Canadian utilities are using conductors built with the higher strength steels with the "M" zinc alloy coating.

=== Lay ===
Lay of a conductor is determined by four extended fingers; "right" or "left" direction of the lay is determined depending if it matches finger direction from right hand or left hand respectively. Overhead aluminium (AAC, AAAC, ACAR) and ACSR conductors in the USA are always manufactured with the outer conductor layer with a right-hand lay. Going toward the center, each layer has alternating lays. Some conductor types (e.g. copper overhead conductor, OPGW, steel EHS) are different and have left-hand lay on the outer conductor. Some South American countries specify left-hand lay for the outer conductor layer on their ACSR, so those are wound differently than those used in the USA.

== Sizing ==
ACSR conductors are available in numerous specific sizes, with single or multiple center steel wires and generally larger quantities of aluminium strands. Although rarely used, there are some conductors that have more steel strands than aluminum strands. An ACSR conductor can in part be denoted by its stranding, for example, an ACSR conductor with 72 aluminium strands with a core of 7 steel strands will be called 72/7 ACSR conductor. Cables generally range from #6 AWG ("6/1" – six outer aluminum conductors and one steel reinforcing conductor) to 2167 kcmil ("72/7" – seventy two outer aluminum conductors and seven steel reinforcing conductors).

=== Naming convention ===
To help avoid confusion due to the numerous to combinations of stranding of the steel and aluminium strands, code words are used to specify a specific conductor version. In North America bird names are used for the code words while animal names are used elsewhere. For instance in North America, Grosbeak is a 322.3 mm^{2} (636 kcmil) ACSR conductor with 26/7 Aluminium/Steel stranding whereas Egret is the same total aluminium size (322.3 mm^{2}, 636 kcmil conductor) but with 30/19 Aluminium/Steel stranding. Although the number of aluminium strands is different between Grosbeak and Egret, differing sizes of the aluminium strands are used to offset the change in the number of strands such that the total amount of aluminium remains the same. Differences in the number of steel strands result in varying weights of the steel portion and also result in different overall conductor diameters. Most utilities standardize on a specific conductor version when various versions of the same amount of aluminum to avoid issues related to different size hardware (such as splices). Due to the numerous different sizes available, utilities often skip over some of the sizes to reduce their inventory. The various stranding versions result in different electrical and mechanical characteristics.

=== Ampacity ratings ===
Manufacturers of ACSR typically provide ampacity tables for a defined set of assumptions. Individual utilities normally apply different ratings due to using varying assumptions (which may be a result in higher or lower amperage ratings than those the manufacturers provide). Significant variables include wind speed and direction relative to the conductor, sun intensity, emissivity, ambient temperature, and maximum conductor temperature.

== Conducting properties ==
In three phase electrical power distribution, conductors must be designed to have low electrical impedance in order to assure that the power lost in the distribution of power is minimal. Impedance is a combination of two quantities: resistance and reactance. The resistances of ASCR conductors are tabulated for different conductor designs by the manufacturer at DC and AC frequency assuming specific operating temperatures. The reasons that resistance changes with frequency are largely due to the skin effect, the proximity effect, and hysteresis loss. Depending on the geometry of the conductor as differentiated by the conductor name, these phenomena have varying degrees of affecting the overall resistance in the conductor at DC vs AC frequency.

Often not tabulated with ACSR conductors is the electrical reactance of the conductor, which is due largely to the spacing between the other current carrying conductors and the conductor radius. The reactance of the conductor contributes significantly to the overall current that needs to travel through the line, and thus contributes to resistive losses in the line. For more information on transmission line inductance and capacitance, see electric power transmission and overhead power line.

=== Skin effect ===
The skin effect decreases the cross sectional area in which the current travels through the conductor as AC frequency increases. For alternating current, most (63%) of the electric current flows between the surface and the skin depth, δ, which depends on the frequency of the current and the electrical (conductivity) and magnetic properties of the conductor. This decreased area causes the resistance to rise due to the inverse relationship between resistance and conductor cross sectional area. The skin effect benefits the design, as it causes the current to be concentrated towards the low-resistivity aluminum on the outside of the conductor. To illustrate the impact of the skin effect, the American Society for Testing and Materials (ASTM) standard includes the conductivity of the steel core when calculating the DC and AC resistance of the conductor, but the IEC and CSA Group standards do not.

=== Proximity effect ===
In a conductor (ACSR and other types) carrying AC current, if currents are flowing through one or more other nearby conductors the distribution of current within each conductor will be constrained to smaller regions. The resulting current crowding is termed as the proximity effect. This crowding gives an increase in the effective AC resistance of the circuit, with the effect at 60 Hertz being greater than at 50 Hertz. Geometry, conductivity, and frequency are factors in determining the amount of proximity effect.

The proximity effect is result of a changing magnetic field which influences the distribution of an electric current flowing within an electrical conductor due to electromagnetic induction. When an alternating current (AC) flows through an isolated conductor, it creates an associated alternating magnetic field around it. The alternating magnetic field induces eddy currents in adjacent conductors, altering the overall distribution of current flowing through them.

The result is that the current is concentrated in the areas of the conductor furthest away from nearby conductors carrying current in the same direction.

=== Hysteresis loss ===
Hysteresis in an ACSR conductor is due to the atomic dipoles in the steel core changing direction due to induction from the 60 or 50 Hertz AC current in the conductor. Hysteresis losses in ACSR are undesirable and can be minimized by using an even number of aluminium layers in the conductor. Due to the cancelling effect of the magnetic field from the opposing lay (right-hand and left-hand) conductors for two aluminium layers there is significantly less hysteresis loss in the steel core than there would be for one or three aluminium layers where the magnetic field does not cancel out.

The hysteresis effect is negligible on ACSR conductors with even numbers of aluminium layers and so it is not considered in these cases. For ACSR conductors with an odd number of aluminium layers however, a magnetization factor is used to accurately calculate the AC resistance. The correction method for single-layer ACSR is different than that used for three-layer conductors. Due to applying the magnetization factor, a conductor with an odd number of layers has an AC resistance slightly higher than an equivalent conductor with an even number of layers.

Due to higher hysteresis losses in the steel and associated heating of the core, an odd-layer design will have a lower ampacity rating (up to a 10% de-rate) than an equivalent even-layer design.

All standard ACSR conductors smaller than Partridge (135.2 mm^{2} {266.8 kcmil} 26/7 Aluminium/Steel) have only one layer due to their small diameters so the hysteresis losses cannot be avoided.

== Non-standard designs ==
ACSR is widely used due to its efficient and economical design. Variations of standard (sometimes called traditional or conventional) ACSR are used in some cases due to the special properties they offer which provide sufficient advantage to justify their added expense. Special conductors may be more economic, offer increased reliability, or provide a unique solution to an otherwise difficult, of impossible, design problem.

The main types of special conductors include "trapezoidal wire conductor" (TW) - a conductor having aluminium strands with a trapezoidal shape rather than round) and "self-damping" (SD), sometimes called "self-damping conductor" (SDC). A similar, higher temperature conductor made from annealed aluminium is called "aluminium conductor steel supported" (ACSS) is also available.

=== Trapezoidal wire ===
Trapezoidal-shaped wire (TW) can be used in lieu of round wire in order to "fill in the gaps" and have a 10–15% smaller overall diameter for the same cross-sectional area or a 20–25% larger cross-sectional area for the same overall diameter.

Ontario Hydro (Hydro One) introduced trapezoidal-shaped wire ACSR conductor designs in the 1980s to replace existing round-wire ACSR designs (they called them compact conductors; these conductor types are now called ACSR/TW). Ontario Hydro's trapezoidal-shaped wire (TW) designs used the same steel core but increased the aluminium content of the conductor to match the overall diameter of the former round-wire designs (they could then use the same hardware fittings for both the round and the TW conductors). Hydro One's designs for their trapezoidal ACSR/TW conductors only use even numbers of aluminium layers (either two layers or four layers). They do not use designs which have odd number of layers (three layers) due to that design incurring higher hysteresis losses in the steel core. Also in the 1980s, Bonneville Power Administration (BPA) introduced TW designs where the size of the steel core was increased to maintain the same Aluminium/Steel ratio.

=== Self-damping ===
Self-damping (ACSR/SD) is a nearly obsolete conductor technology and is rarely used for new installations. It is a concentric-lay stranded, self-damping conductor designed to control wind induced (Aeolian-type) vibration in overhead transmission lines by internal damping. Self-damping conductors consists of a central core of one or more round steel wires surrounded by two layers of trapezoidal shaped aluminium wires. One or more layers of round aluminium wires may be added as required.

SD conductor differs from conventional ACSR in that the aluminium wires in the first two layers are trapezoidal shaped and sized so that each aluminium layer forms a stranded tube which does not collapse onto the layer beneath when under tension, but maintains a small annular gap between layers. The trapezoidal wire layers are separated from each other and from the steel core by the two smaller annular gaps that permit movement between the layers. The round aluminium wire layers are in tight contact with each other and the underlying trapezoidal wire layer.

Under vibration, the steel core and the aluminium layers vibrate with different frequencies and impact damping results. This impact damping is sufficient to keep any Aeolian vibration to a low level. The use of trapezoidal strands also results in reduced conductor diameter for a given AC resistance per mile.

The major advantages ACSR/SD are:

- High self-damping allows the use of higher unloaded tension levels resulting in reduced maximum sag and thus reduced structure height and/or fewer structures per km [or per mile].
- Reduced diameter for a given AC resistance yielding reduced structure transverse wind and ice loading.

The major disadvantages ACSR/SD are:

- There most likely will be increased installation and clipping costs due to special hardware requirements and specialized stringing methods.
- The conductor design always requires the use of a steel core even in light loading areas.

=== Aluminium-conductor steel supported ===
Aluminium-conductor steel supported (ACSS) conductor visually appears to be similar to standard ACSR but the aluminium strands are fully annealed. Annealing the aluminium strands reduces the composite conductor strength, but after installation, permanent elongation of the aluminium strands results in a much larger percentage of the conductor tension being carried in the steel core than is true for standard ACSR. This in turn yields reduced composite thermal elongation and increased self-damping.

The major advantages of ACSS are:

- Since the aluminium strands are "dead-soft" to begin with, the conductor may be operated at temperatures in excess of 200 °C (392 °F) without loss of strength.
- Since the tension in the aluminium strands is normally low, the conductor's self-damping of Aeolian vibration is high and it may be installed at high unloaded tension levels without the need for separate Stockbridge-type dampers.

The major disadvantages of ACSS are:

- In areas experiencing heavy ice load, the reduced strength of this conductor relative to standard ACSR may make it less desirable.
- The softness of the annealed aluminium strands and the possible need for pre-stressing prior to clipping and sagging may raise installation costs.

=== Twisted pair ===
Twisted pair (TP) conductor (sometimes called by the trade-names T-2 or VR) has the two sub-conductors twisted (usually with a left-hand lay) about one another generally with a lay length of approximately three meters (nine feet).

The conductor cross-section of the TP is a rotating "figure-8". The sub-conductors can be any type of standard ACSR conductor but the conductors need to match one another to provide mechanical balance.

The major advantages of TP conductor are:

- The use of the TP conductor reduces the propensity of ice/wind galloping starting on the line. In an ice storm when ice deposits start to accumulate along the conductor the twisted conductor profile prevents a uniform airfoil shape from forming. With a standard round conductor the airfoil shape results in uplift of the conductor and initiation of the galloping motion. The TP conductor profile and this absence of the uniform airfoil shape inhibits the initiation of the galloping motion. The reduction in motion during icing events helps prevent the phase conductors from contacting each other causing a fault and an associated outage of the electrical circuit. With the reduction in large amplitude motions, closer phase spacing or longer span lengths can be used. This in turn can result in a lower cost of construction. TP conductor is generally installed only in areas that normally are exposed to wind speed and freezing temperature conditions associated with ice buildup.
- The non-round shape of this conductor reduces the amplitude of Aeolian vibration and the accompanying fatigue inducing strains near splices and conductor attachment clamps. TP conductors can gently rotate to dissipate energy. As a result, TP conductor can be installed to higher tension levels and reduced sags.

The major disadvantages of TP conductor are:

- The non-round cross-section yields wind and ice loadings which are about 11% higher than standard conductor of the same AC resistance per mile.
- The installation of, and hardware for this conductor, can be somewhat more expensive than standard conductor.

== Splicing ==
Many electrical circuits are longer than the length of conductor which can be contained on one reel. As a result, splicing is often necessary to join conductors to provide the desired length. It is important that the splice not be the weak link. A splice (joint) must have high physical strength along with a high electrical current rating. Within the limitations of the equipment used to install the conductor from the reels, a sufficient length of conductor is generally purchased that the reel can accommodate to avoid more splices than are absolutely necessary.

Splices are designed to run cooler than the conductor. The temperature of the splice is kept lower by having a larger cross-sectional area and thus less electrical resistance than the conductor. Heat generated at the splice is also dissipated faster due to the larger diameter of the splice.

Failures of splices are of concern, as a failure of just one splice can cause an outage that affects a large amount of electrical load.

Most splices are compression-type splices (crimps). These splices are inexpensive and have good strength and conductivity characteristics.

Some splices, called automatics, use a jaw-type design that is faster to install (does not require the heavy compression equipment) and are often used during storm restoration when speed of installation is more important than the long term performance of the splice.

Causes for splice failures are numerous. Some of the main failure modes are related to installation issues, such as: insufficient cleaning (wire brushing) of the conductor to eliminate the aluminium oxide layer (which has a high resistance {is a poor electrical conductor}), improper application of conducting grease, improper compression force, improper compression locations or number of compressions.

Splice failures can also be due to Aeolian vibration damage as the small vibrations of the conductor over time cause damage (breakage) of the aluminium strands near the ends of the splice.

Special splices (two-piece splices) are required on SD-type conductors as the gap between the trapezoidal aluminium layer and the steel core prevents the compression force on the splice to the steel core to be adequate. A two-piece design has a splice for the steel core and a longer and larger-diameter splice for the aluminium portion. The outer splice must be threaded on first and slid along the conductor and the steel splice compressed first and then the outer splice is slid back over the smaller splice and then compressed. This complicated process can easily result in a poor splice.

Splices can also fail partially, where they have higher resistance than expected, usually after some time in the field. These can be detected using thermal camera, thermal probes, and direct resistance measurements, even when the line is energized. Such splices usually require replacement, either on deenergized line, by doing a temporary bypass to replace it, or by adding a big splice over the existing splice, without disconnecting.

== Conductor coatings ==
When ACSR is new, the aluminium has a shiny surface which has a low emissivity for heat radiation and a low absorption of sunlight. As the conductor ages the color becomes dull gray due to the oxidation reaction of the aluminium strands. In high pollution environments, the color may turn almost black after many years of exposure to the elements and chemicals. For aged conductor, the emissivity for heat radiation and the absorption of sunlight increases. Conductor coatings are available that have a high emissivity for high heat radiation and a low absorption of sunlight. These coatings would be applied to new conductor during manufacture. These types of coatings have the ability to potentially increase the current rating of the ACSR conductor. For the same amount of amperage, the temperature of the same conductor will be lower due to the better heat dissipation of the higher emissivity coating.

== See also ==
- ACCC conductor
- Copper clad steel
