= ACCC conductor =

Type of overhead power line conductor

ACCC (Aluminum Conductor Composite Core) is a registered trade mark for a type of "high-temperature low-sag" (HTLS) overhead power line conductor.

== Description ==
CTC Global developed and commercialized the ACCC Conductor.

The ACCC patent filed by CTC Global was revoked on July 3, 2019, by the European Patent Office (EPO), after an opposition procedure filed by Epsilon Composite, Mercury Cable & Energy, and Mercury Cable International.

== Suspected frauds and legal infringements ==
1. In 2017, the Premium Times published an article about cases of corruption involving CTC Global and Power Transmissions officials, covering ACCC contracts from 2012 up to 2017.
2. In 2018, Jason Huang, CTC's Former CEO and then Chief Technology Officer from 2010 to 2016, claimed in a California court proceeding that he was wrongfully terminated by CTC because he challenged CTC's fraudulent representation that its product could perform in a manner CTC had not evidenced it could, which put the public at risk. CTC Global and Jason Huang signed a settlement agreement to close the litigation on June 30, 2020.
3. In 2011, CTC Global was acquired by 2 Russian conglomerates, Kaskol and Ru-Com, which are owned by Russian oligarchs involved in the Russian military complex. In 2023, the European parliament examined suspected circumvention of sanctions against Russia by CTC Global on ACCC project .

== Advantages ==
It is able to carry approximately twice as much current as a traditional aluminium-conductor steel-reinforced cable (ACSR) cable of the same size and weight.

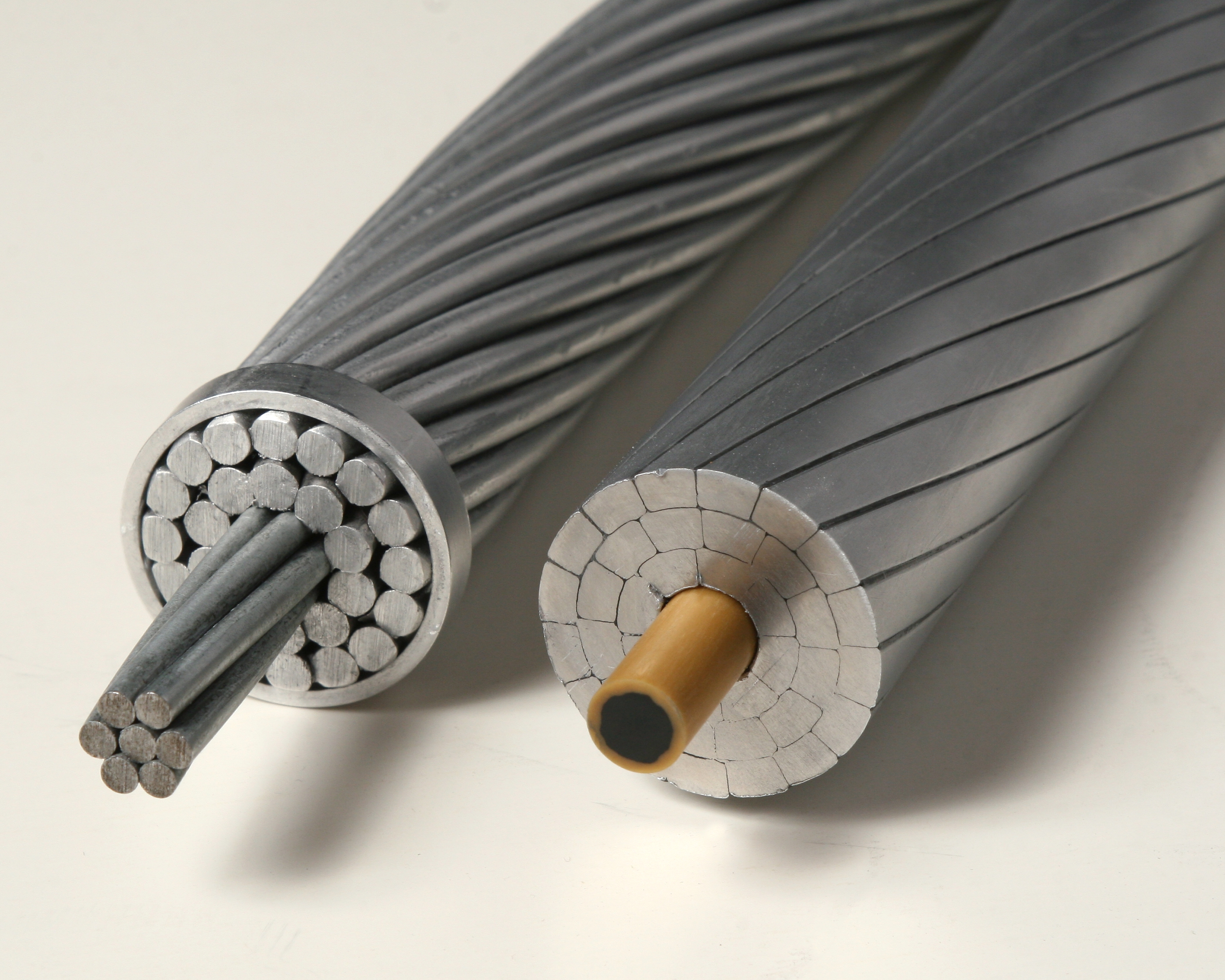
Steel-reinforced ACSR and composite-core ACCC conductors

Its light weight and softness result in roughly 30% greater conductivity than an equivalent ACSR conductor, allowing 14% more current to be carried at equal temperature. For example, 1.107 in (28.1 mm) diameter ACCC "Drake" conductor at 75 °C has an AC resistance of 106 mΩ/mile, while equivalent ACSR conductor has an AC resistance of 139 mΩ/mile, 31% higher.

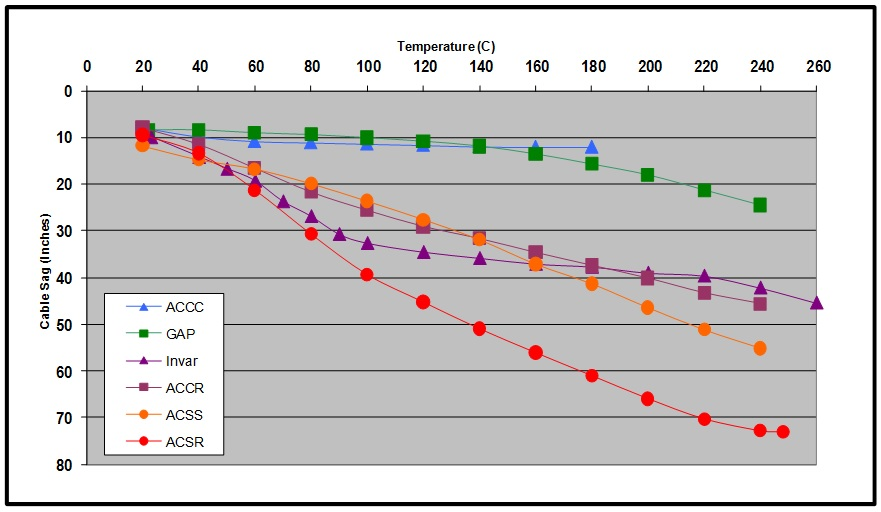
Sag Comparison Test Data: temperature vs. sag of various conductor types on a 215' test span.

Operation at high temperatures implies high line losses, which may be uneconomical, but the ability to carry such current contributes to the redundancy of the electric grid (the high overload capacity can stop a potential cascading failure) and thus can be valuable even when rarely used directly. Even at higher operating temperatures, the ACCC conductor's added aluminum content and lower electrical resistance offers reduced line losses compared to other conductors of the same diameter and weight.

== Disadvantages ==
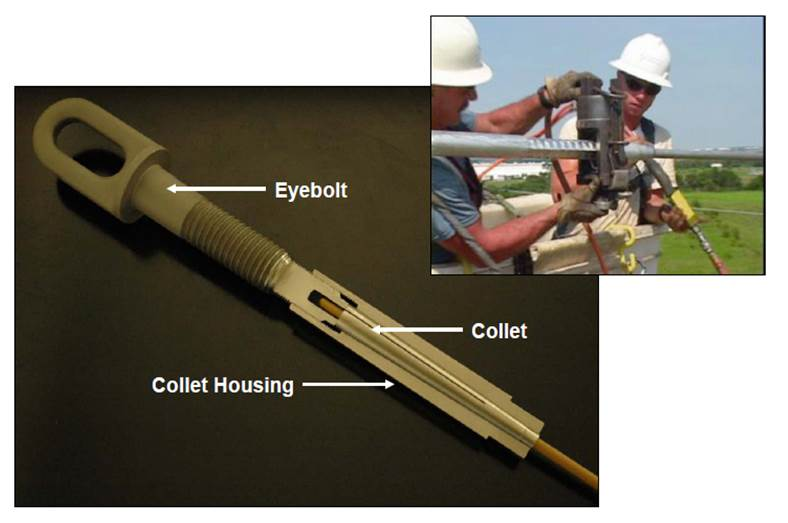
ACCC-specific conductor dead-end Assembly. This grips only the central strength member.

- The primary disadvantage is cost; ACCC costs 2.5–3 times as much as ACSR cable.
- Although ACCC has significantly less thermal sag than even other HTLS conductor designs, it has a lower axial stiffness. Therefore, it sags more than other designs under ice load, although an "ultra-low-sag" (higher modulus) version is available at a cost premium. Also, other aluminium alloys with an increased strength at the expense of electrical conductivity can be used to improve ice load sag. Ice load can also lead to the loosening of outer layer strands because of plastic deformation by the attached weight.
- Annealed aluminum is extremely soft and makes the conductor prone to surface damage during installation if mishandled.
- The conductor has a larger minimum bend radius, requiring extra care during installation.
- The conductor requires special fittings and stringing equipment that are more expensive.
